= Dilip Shahani =

Indian academic and engineer

Dr. Dilip Shahani
- Education: Indian Institute of Technology Kharagpur; Indian Institute of Technology Delhi
- Occupations: Engineer, Academician, Technocrat
- Known for: Contributions to India's EVM and VVPAT technology
- Awards: Padma Shri (2022); National Award for Best Electoral Practices (2017)

Dilip T. Shahani is an Indian academician, engineer, and technocrat, known for his contributions to the field of education and the development of electronic systems, particularly the Electronic Voting Machine (EVM) and Voter-verified Paper Audit Trail (VVPAT) technology platforms in India. He was awarded the Padma Shri, the fourth highest civilian award in India, in 2022 in the field of Literature and Education.

== Career ==
Shahani is an Honorary Professor at the Indian Institute of Technology Delhi (IIT Delhi), where he served as a faculty member for over four decades. He holds a PhD from IIT Delhi and was a silver medalist (1973) from Indian Institute of Technology Kharagpur where he did his B.Tech in ECE.

Sahani served as the head of department twice during his tenure at IIT Delhi. He has received recognition for his work in teaching and technology development, including awards for 'Excellence in Teaching' and 'Technology Development and Transfer in Electromagnetic Systems'.

Shahani has also worked as a technical expert for the Election Commission of India for several years, assisting with the design and development of India's EVM and VVPAT systems. For his contributions in this area, he was awarded the National Award for Best Electoral Practices in 2017. Since 2016, he has been involved in the latest EVM design for the Election Commission.
