= Autophone =

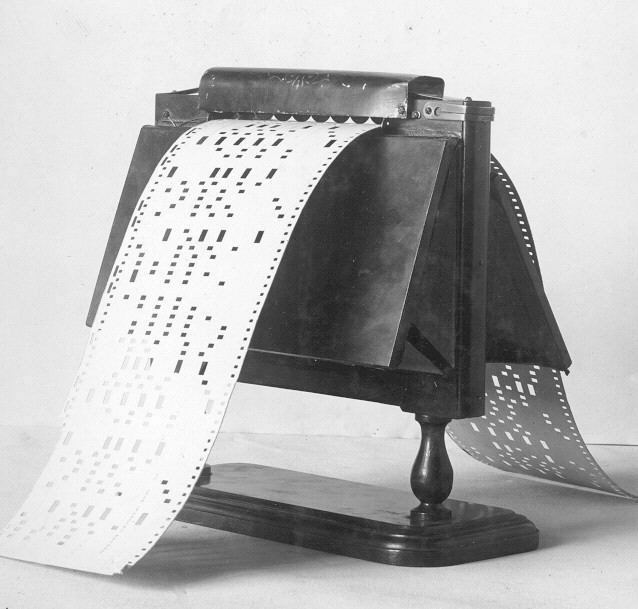
An autophone

The Autophone was an early type of organette, invented in 1878 by Henry Bishop Horton. One of the first table-top organettes to be mass-produced, it played music using punched cards to activate 22 reeds.

== See also ==
The dictionary definition of Autophone at Wiktionary
