= Totaliser =

Voting machine mechanism

Totaliser is a proposed mechanism in the voting machines in India to hide the booth-wise voting patterns. A totaliser allows the votes cast in about 14 polling booths to be counted together. At present, the votes are tallied booth by booth.

== Functioning ==
Bharat Electronics Limited, Bengaluru, and Electronics Corporation of India Limited, Hyderabad, developed the totaliser. Totaliser is an interface, which is connected to main control unit of a cluster of 14 EVMs and the consolidated count of votes cast for each candidate in that group of EVMs can be obtained by pressing the result button in the totaliser without disclosing the votes polled by a candidate area-wise.

== History ==
A Public Interest Litigation has been filed in Supreme Court in 2014 seeking a direction to the poll panel to mix up the votes cast in the various polling stations in a constituency, to prevent the candidates intimidating voters in areas that had rebuffed them. Election Commission of India initially suggested the measure to UPA Government in 2008.

During the 2014 Indian general election, former Maharashtra deputy chief minister Ajit Pawar allegedly threatened the voters that his party, the Nationalist Congress Party, would be able to detect the voting patterns from the electronic voting machine readings and cut off their water supply if they snubbed it in the constituency of Baramati. The Law Commission said the Totaliser would also help in situations such as that witnessed in the constituency of Hoshangabad in 2014, where a lone voter voted at the Mokalvada polling station in the Sohagpur area. Before the introduction of electronic voting machines in India, ballot papers were mixed wherever necessary to prevent disclosure of the voting patterns.

In February 2017, NDA Government opposed totaliser in its affidavit in Supreme Court, while Law Commission of India and the Election Commission of India had favoured the introduction of a totaliser.

Congress, NCP and BSP “categorically” supported its proposal to use ‘totaliser’ machine while BJP, Trinamool Congress and PMK opposed totaliser.

== See also ==
- Electronic voting in India
- Voter-verified paper audit trail
- Vote counting system
- Voting machine
- 49-O
- NOTA
