= Electronic voting in India =

Component of Indian electoral system

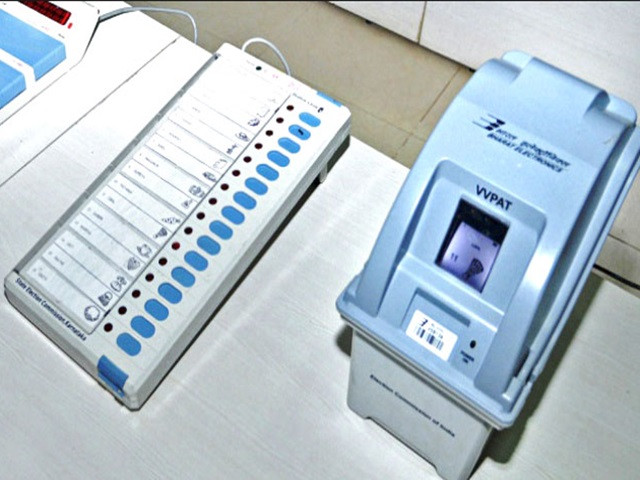
Electronic voting machine (left) with a voter-verified paper audit trail used in Indian elections

Electronic voting is the standard means of conducting elections in India using Electronic Voting Machines (EVMs). The system was developed for the Election Commission of India by state-owned Electronics Corporation of India and Bharat Electronics. Beginning in the late 1990s, EVMs were introduced in Indian elections in a phased manner.

Prior to the introduction of electronic voting, paper ballots were used and counting manually. Printing paper ballots were expensive, required substantial resources and time to count individual ballots, and were susceptible to fraudulent practices such as the use of pre-filled fake ballots. The introduction of EVMs has reduced the election costs significantly, shortened the time required for counting, and enabled faster announcement of results. EVMs have also helped curb certain fraudulent electoral practices through security features such as locking mechanisms, limits on the rate of voting per minute, and verification of thumb impressions. EVMs are stand-alone, battery-powered machines that use write once read many memory. They do not require network connectivity, and have no wireless or wired components that connect to the internet.

Various opposition parties have, at times, alleged that EVMs were faulty after they failed to defeat the incumbent party. In 2013, the Supreme Court of India directed the Election Commission to include a paper trail to help verify the vote cast using the EVMs. The Election Commission subsequently developed EVMs with voter-verified paper audit trail (VVPAT), which was trialed for the first time in the 2014 Indian general election. Following a 2019 ruling by the Supreme Court, EVMs accompanied by VVPATs have been used in all the elections, with a small percentage (2%) of the VVPAT records verified to ensure the reliability before the final results are certified.

The Election Commission of India has stated that the machines, system checks, safeguarding procedures, and election protocols have been designed to prevent tampering. To mitigate any concerns regarding the integrity of the hardware, a sample number of votes for each political party's nominee are entered into each machine before the election day in the presence of polling agents. At the end of this trial run, the votes are counted and compared with the sample votes entered. The process is intended to ensure that the machine's hardware has not been tampered with, is operating correctly, and do not contain hidden or pre-recorded votes.

== Background ==
Paper ballots were exclusively used during elections till the 1990s. With the paper ballots, substantial resources were required for printing, transportation, storage and counting of individual ballots. Paper ballots were prone to fraudulent voting and booth capturing, where party loyalists captured booths and stuffed them with pre-filled fake ballots. Since the late 1950s, there were multiple documented cases of such activities being reported and the problem grew between the 1950s and 1980s, becoming a serious and large scale problem in certain states and regions often accompanied with violence. In the late 1970s, Election Commission of India sought a solution for the issues which resulted in the development of electronic voting machines (EVM).

== History ==
=== Design and introduction ===
The idea of using an Electronic Voting Machine (EVM) was proposed in 1977 and Electronics Corporation of India (ECIL) was tasked with the development of the same. A working model was evolved in 1979 and was showcased to various political parties in August 1980. Bharat Electronics (BEL) and ECIL were tasked with manufacturing EVMs. The EVMs were first trialed in May 1982 in the by-election to Paravur assembly constituency in Kerala in a limited number of polling stations. In a ruling on a case filed against the usage of EVMs in the by-election, the Supreme Court of India ruled that the Representation of People Act, 1951 and the Conduct of Election Rules, 1961 specified the usage of paper ballots and forbade the use of any new methods including electronic voting. The court stated the manner in which the orders were issued for the use of EVMs was unconstitutional and the usage of any alternate means would require to be specified under the law. By the time of the verdict, EVMs had been used in several other elections and the court did not rule on the results of those elections.

=== Wider adoption ===
Post the court ruling, as there was no provision explicitly permitting the usage of EVMs, it was not deployed immediately. An amendment to the Representation of the People Act, 1951 which allowed the usage of EVMs, was passed by the Parliament of India in December 1988 and came into force in March 1989. In March 1992, changes were made to the Conduction of Election Rules, 1961 by the Government of India to permit the usage of electronic voting. The deployment was delayed as general consensus could not be reached with the political parties and other stakeholders on the usage of EVMs. In 1998, the machines were used on an experimental basis across 25 state assembly constituencies during the assembly elections in Rajasthan, Madhya Pradesh and Delhi. In May 2001, EVMs were used in all constituencies for the state assembly elections in Tamil Nadu, Kerala, Puducherry and West Bengal. In 2004, in the General Election, the EVMs were used in all 543 Parliamentary Constituencies for the first time. Since the time, all state assembly and parliamentary elections are held using the EVMs.

=== Further improvements ===
As it was possible to know how many people from a polling station exactly voted for a candidate, there was a probability that a winning candidate might show favoritism or hold a grudge on specific areas depending on the votes received. In order to mitigate the issue, a totaliser was developed in 2008, which was connected to several EVM units and displayed only the overall results instead of votes from individual machines.

After a consultation with the political parties in 2010, the Election Commission appointed an expert technical committee to study the feasibility of a voter-verified paper audit trail (VVPAT) in EVMs as a measure of transparency. The committee was tasked with examining the possibility of displaying a printed paper to a voter which consisted of the symbol of the party to which the vote was cast. Based on the recommendation of the committee, a VVPAT system was developed and was put on field trials in 2011. In July 2011, trials were conducted at 175 polling booths in Ladakh, Thiruvananthapuram, Cherrapunjee, East Delhi and Jaisalmer to test the performance of the VVPAT system under various weather conditions.

VVPAT was further introduced on a trial basis in a by-poll at Noksen in Nagaland in September 2013. It was later used in various legislative elections and in eight Lok Sabha constituencies in 2014 Indian general election. Following a directive of the Supreme Court on 8 October 2013, the Election Commission of India introduced VVPATs along with EVMs in a phased manner. In 2019, the Supreme Court further directed that a small percentage (2%) of the VVPATs to be verified to ensure the reliability before the final results were certified.

== Design and technology ==
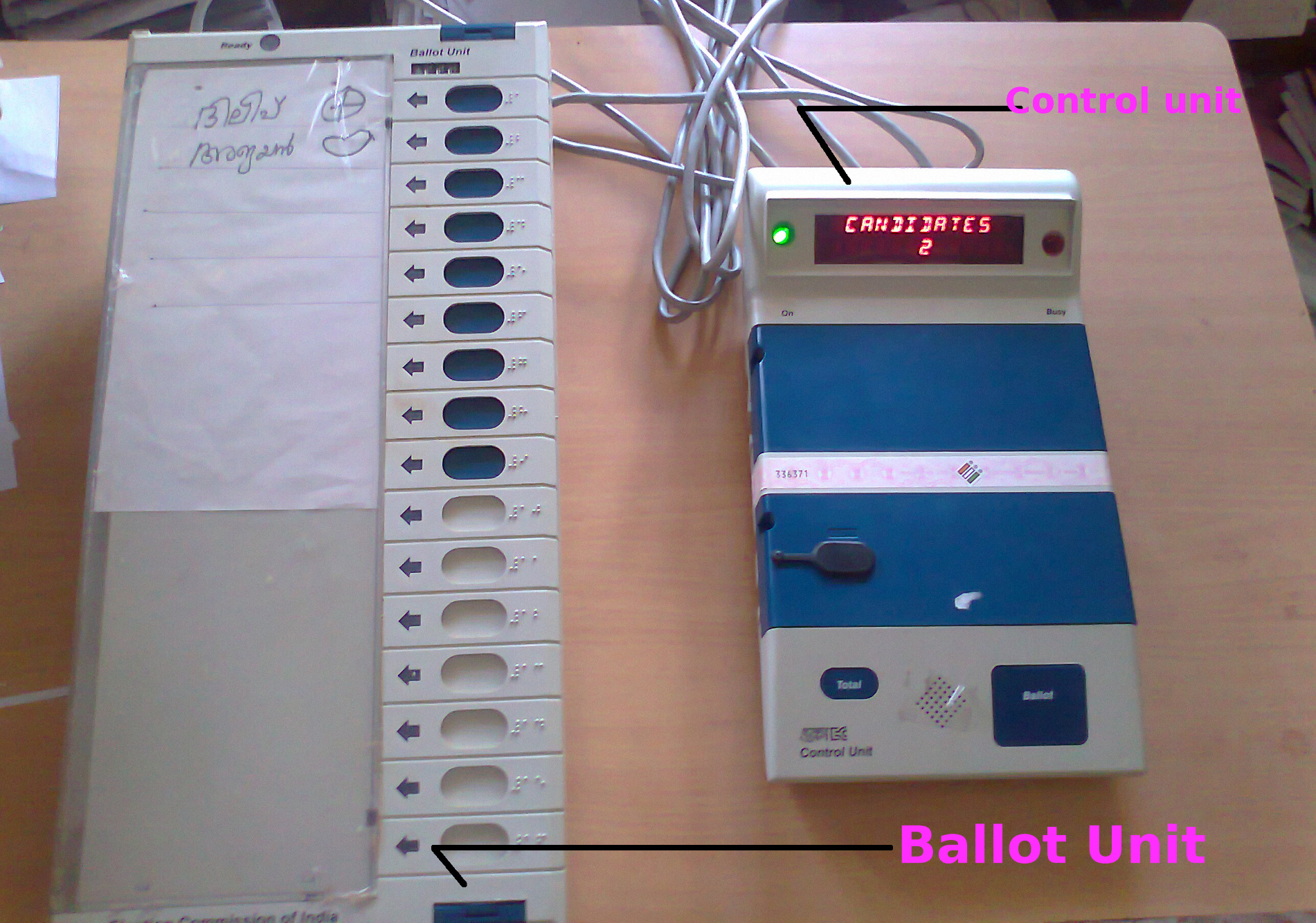
Ballot unit (left) and Control unit (right)

The EVM was designed by a team led by A.G. Rao and Ravi Poovaiah, professors at IIT Bombay. An EVM consists of two units, a control unit, and the ballot unit which are connected by a cable. The ballot unit facilitates the actual voting by a voter and consists of a ballot paper screen with the names of candidates and their symbols alongside labeled buttons, indicator lights and Braille signage. The control unit is responsible for the operational control of the ballot units, stores the vote counts and displays the results on LED displays. The control unit is pre-programmed at the time of manufacturing and cannot be altered later.

The machines are powered by a 7.5 volt battery inserted into the control unit. The designers intentionally opted for battery power, to prevent the possibility of power cables interfering with the functioning and the EVMs can function without a secondary power source. The two units work in tandem and cannot work independently. The EVMs do not have any communication components or internet interface. The ballot unit has an internal clock and a pre-programmed protocol by which it records every input-output event with a timestamp provided it is powered.

A single ballot unit can list a maximum of 16 candidates and as a part of the initial design, up to four ballot units could be connected in parallel to a single control unit to cater to a maximum of 64 candidates. After an upgrade in 2013, 24 ballot units can now be connected to a single unit so that it can cater to a maximum of 384 candidates. A single machine can record a maximum of 2000 votes. The devices were designed to prevent fraud by limiting the number of new votes can be entered into the machine in a given time frame. In a minute, the EVMs can register a maximum of five votes. The later version of the EVMs are all equipped with VVPAT capability. VVPAT system which was an upgrade of the EVMs had modified software that allowed a printer to be attached to the machine. In June 2018, a built-in-hood was added to protect the printer and other devices from excess light and heat in VVPAT systems.

== Usage ==
Sketch of the Ballot unit of the EVM used to cast votes

The EVMs are inventoried and stored at secure locations when not in use. They are tracked by the Election Commission of India on a real-time basis and distributed randomly to the polling booths. In 2017, the Election Commission decided to replace all first generation machines and most of the machines in use in 2024 belong to the third generation. Prior to the elections, the machines are randomly allocated to polling booths and sample checks are carried out to ensure working condition. Ballot papers are inserted into the displays in the ballot unit and test votes for each nominee is entered into the machine in the presence of polling agents and counted to match with the entered sample votes.

Before the voting, the control units are sealed. The control unit is operated by the polling booth officer, while the ballot unit is operated by the voter in privacy. The officer confirms the voter's identification before electronically activating the ballot unit to accept a new vote. Once the voter enters the vote, the ballot unit displays the vote to the voter and records it in its memory. Post the voting, the polling officer presses the close button and the control unit registers the polled votes. The units are identified by unique identifier numbers and the a particular control unit is designed to work with a specific ballot unit. Once the polling process is completed, the votes are recorded in the device's memory on the same order of polling and the device's ability to accept additional votes is disabled. The control unit can store the vote in its memory for more than ten years. With the VVPAT system, when a vote is cast, it is recorded in its memory and simultaneously a serial number and vote data is printed out for the voter to verify the same. The Election Commission maintains a database of thumb impressions and signatures of the voters along with identification, which is matched in order to identify the eligibility of a voter and ensure that a voter cannot cast a ballot more than once.

After a poll closes on an election day, the Presiding officer will hand over an account of votes recorded in each machine to the polling agents of the political parties. The units are separated and the control units moved and stored separately in locked and guarded premises. At the time of counting of votes, the results are displayed on the control unit on pressing the "Result" button. The button cannot be pressed before the polling is closed by the polling officer-in-charge. It is usually hidden and is exposed only at the counting center in the presence of the designated officer. The total displayed will also be tallied with the count given on the polling day.

== Cost and efficiency ==
The manufacturing cost per EVM was ₹5,500 (equivalent to ₹64,000 or US$670 in 2026) for the first batch of machines that were purchased in 1989–90. The cost of the production of later models was estimated to be ₹8,670 (equivalent to ₹30,000 or US$320 in 2026) in 2006. The cost was estimated to be ₹10,500 (equivalent to ₹18,000 or US$190 in 2026) per unit based on an additional order placed in 2014. Though the design, production and procurement was capital intensive, it has helped reduce the cost incurred on the printing of ballot papers, their transportation and storage and the counting staff and the remuneration paid to them. EVMs are easier to transport compared to ballot boxes as they are lighter, more portable, and come with polypropylene carrying cases. As there are reduced probability of malfeasance and rejection of votes, it eliminates the requirement of re-polling due to these issues. An independent study had also indicated that the voting by the economically weaker section have increased due to the ease of usage with EVMs. The shelf life of an EVM is estimated to be 15 years.

== Reliability ==
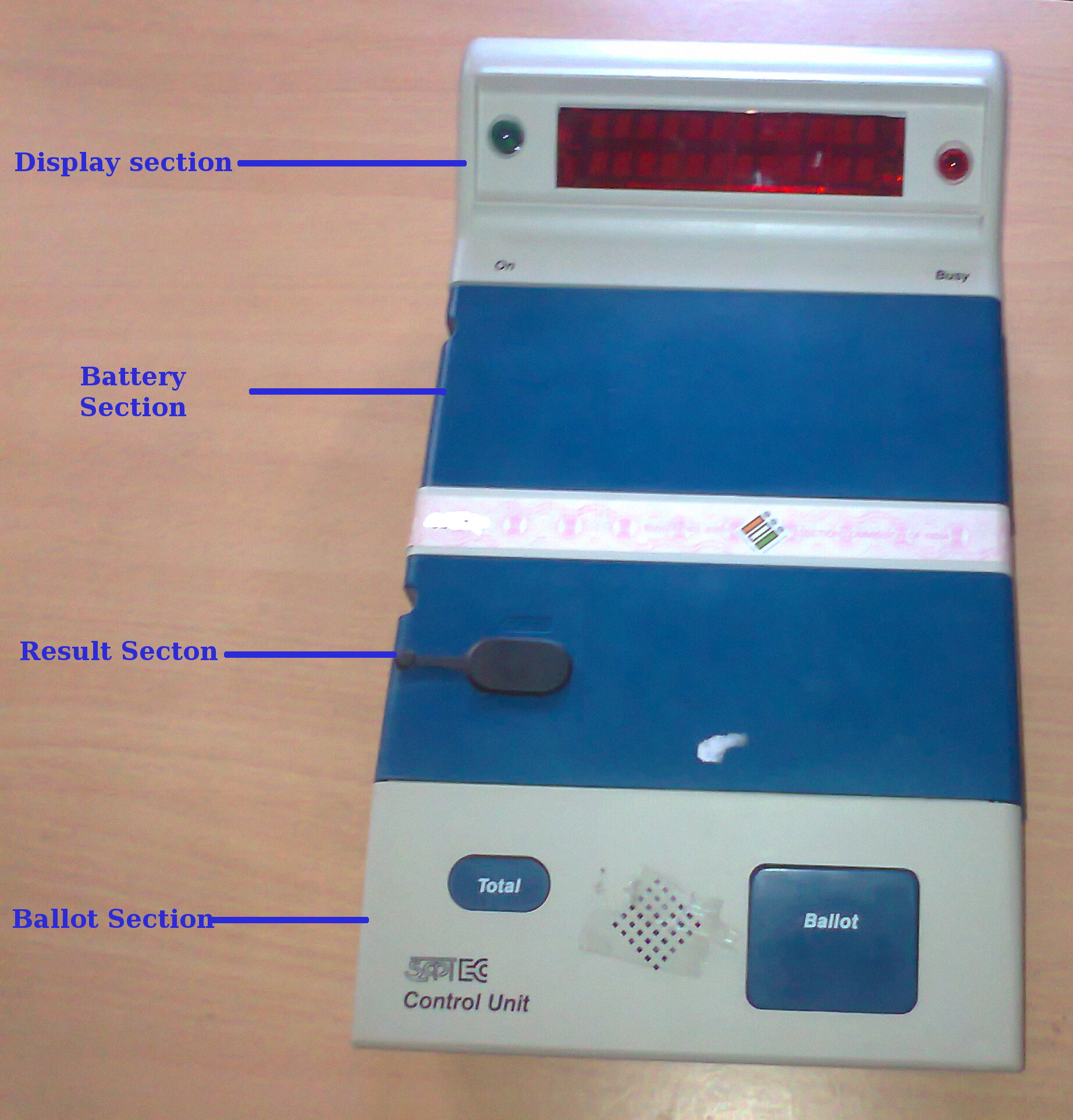
The Election Commission of India has stated that the control unit (pictured) in designed to prevent tampering

The use of EVMs and questions of their reliability have been raised by academics and politicians. In February 2010, an international conference held under the chairmanship of Subramanian Swamy blamed the Election Commission for shirking from its responsibility on proving the transparency of EVMs. In April 2010, an independent security analysis undertaken by Alex Halderman, Hari K. Prasad, Rop Gonggrijp, and others found that the machines could be manipulated by people who have physical access to the machines. While manufacturing, people with access could insert malicious hardware and people with physical access between voting and counting could change vote totals or learn about the results earlier. It suggested moving to a voting system that provides greater transparency such as paper ballots, precinct count optical scan, or a voter verified paper audit trail for skeptical voters to observe the physical counting process to gain confidence that the outcome is fair. In August 2010, Prasad, one of the authors of the research, was arrested and charged with suspected EVM theft, which was denied by Halderman. A research from The Hindu shared similar concerns that the EVMs could be manipulated during manufacturing, storage during the non-election periods and service of the machines by authorised technicians. It further suggested the usage of paper trail for verification and the use of authentication units to check the devices for counterfeit or tampered units.

In August 2017, EVMs from multiple countries were hacked by programmers at the EVM Hacking village at the 25th DEF CON conference held at Las Vegas. Indian made EVMs however, were not included as part of the event. In the same year, the Election Commission organized an open hackathon encouraging people to attempt hacking of EVMs used by the commission in various Indian elections. While the Commission announced that no attempts were made to demonstrate any vulnerabilities in the event, the registered participants claimed that the Commission made only a few select machines available and imposed additional conditions. In January 2019, a self proclaimed cyber expert based in London claimed that the results can be manipulated by using low frequency signals. The Election Commission however dismissed the allegations since the machines did not use wireless frequencies to communicate with other devices and no proof was provided by the expert to demonstrate the hacking of the devices.

The Election Commission and the manufacturers of the EVMs have consistently rejected the possibility of EVM tampering. They have maintained that the machines are tamper-proof as the programming is done at a secure manufacturing facility. They have also contended that there is no connecting or transmission devices attached to the machines and the machines are securely stored with a real-time logging system in the machine detecting any access or attempts to change. Concerns have also been raised on the software which could be tampered with during initial programming and could be programmed to register a particular button. The Commission responded that the buttons are interchangeable and the order of candidates is randomly selected.

There have been multiple cases against the usage of EVMs before the state high courts and the Supreme Court of India. The courts have often dismissed these cases and ruled in the favor of the Election Commission and the Supreme Court has declared that the use of EVMs is constitutionally valid. A PIL was filed in the Supreme Court in 2011 for directing the Election Commission to modify the EVMs to give a slip printed with the symbol of the party in whose favor the voter cast. On 17 January 2012, Delhi High Court in its ruling on Subramanian Swamy's writ petition challenging the use of EVMs in the present form asked the Election Commission to hold wider consultations with the executive, political parties and other stakeholders on the matter. Following further petitions in the Supreme Court and the subsequent ruling in 2013 led to the use of VVPATs.

== Export to other countries ==
Nepal, Bhutan, Namibia and Kenya have acquired India-manufactured EVMs. In 2013, the Election Commission of Namibia acquired 1700 control units and 3500 ballot units from Bharat Electronics Limited and these units were used in the regional and presidential elections in 2014. Several other Asian and African countries have also expressed interested in using the Indian made EVMs.

== See also ==
- None of the above – Ballot option to not vote for any candidate
- Postal voting – Voting, election, ballot papers, distributed to electors or returned by post, mail
- Risk-limiting audit – Procedure in which post-election tabulation is audited for risk limits
- Voting machine – Machine used to vote in elections
