= Henry Horton =

Henry Horton may refer to:

- Henry Hollis Horton (1866–1934), American politician in Tennessee
- Henry Horton (newspaper proprietor) (1870–1943), owner of The New Zealand Herald
- Henry Horton (sportsman) (1923–1998), English cricketer and footballer
- Henry Bishop Horton (1819–1885), American inventor

== See also ==
- Henry Horton State Park, Chapel Hill, Tennessee, United States
- Henry Horton Miller (1861–1916), Canadian politician
