= Mercuri method =

The Mercuri method is the most popular and notable form of a voter verified paper audit trail (VVPAT). It is a modification to direct-recording electronic (DRE) voting machines to provide a physical paper audit record that may be used to verify an electronic vote count.

Because electronic voting machines record votes internally, in computer software, vote fraud may be difficult to detect. Reconciling the electronic vote count with the physical vote count in all, or a random sampling of, machines allows poll-workers to screen for fraud. An election using this method would benefit from the efficiency of the DRE machines with the confidence instilled by a physical record.

The method works by displaying a paper vote record under glass or clear plastic after a voter indicates their choices. The voter is instructed to verify that the paper record correctly indicates their vote. They finalize their vote by pressing a button or pulling a lever, and the paper record is stored. (This is called a voter verified paper audit trail.) At no point can the voter remove the paper record from the voting area. To do so would allow for there to be a receipt that could be used to coerce the voter into voting for a candidate or to allow selling of votes.

The Mecuri method is named after Rebecca Mercuri who described it in her PhD thesis at the University of Pennsylvania in 2000.
