= Ravi Poovaiah =

Indian academician

Professor Ravi Poovaiah
- Occupations: Academician, Designer
- Notable work: co-designed Electronic Voting Machine

Ravi Poovaiah, is a Professor and Emeritus Fellow at the IDC School of Design at IIT Bombay and a co-designer of the Indian electronic voting machine

== Career ==
Poovaiah has a degree in Mechanical Engineering from IIT Madras, a degree in Product Design and Graphic Arts from Rhode Island School of Design (RISD), Providence, USA and an M.Tech. degree from IIT Bombay. At IIT Bombay, Poovaiah holds the D L Shah Chair for Innovation. He is the Coordinator of the 'e-Kalpa' project, that is sponsored by the MHRD, co-director of ‘The Centre of Social Media Innovations for Communities (COSMIC)’, a collaborative initiative between IIT Bombay, the National University of Singapore and Nanyang Technological University, Singapore and the principal investigator of the D'Source project. Poovaiah has been instrumental in pushing for open sourcing of design and design education in schools.

== Notable students ==
- Pranav Mistry

== Selected publications ==
- Design for Tomorrow―Volume 1: Proceedings of ICoRD 2021: 221 (Smart Innovation, Systems and Technologies)
- Design for Tomorrow-Volume 2: Proceedings of ICoRD 2021
- Design for Tomorrow―Volume 3: Proceedings of ICoRD 2021: 223 (Smart Innovation, Systems and Technologies)
