= Rebecca Mercuri =

American expert in computer security

- Education: University of Pennsylvania
- Known for: Mercuri method
- Scientific career
- Fields: Computer security, computer forensics
- Workplaces: Notable Software
- Thesis: Electronic Vote Tabulation: Checks & Balances (2000)
- Website: www.notablesoftware.com

Rebecca Mercuri is a computer scientist specializing in computer security and computer forensics. She is considered a leading expert on electronic voting systems.

== Education ==
Mercuri earned her Ph.D. from the University of Pennsylvania in 2000 after defending her thesis on electronic voting. She was a fellow at the Belfer Center for Science and International Affairs at the John F. Kennedy School of Government. From 2004–2005, she was a computer science fellow at Harvard University's Radcliffe Institute for Advanced Study, focusing on transparency and trust in computational systems.

== Career ==
In 1981, Mercuri founded the computer security and forensics consulting company Notable Software, where she continues to work.

In 2000, Mercuri provided expert testimony to the U.S. Court of Appeals in the proceedings following the 2000 United States presidential election, and was mentioned in a brief presented to the Supreme Court for the Bush v. Gore decision. She has also provided testimony to the United States House Committee on Science, Space and Technology; the Federal Election Commission; the United States Commission on Civil Rights; the National Institute of Standards and Technology; and the Cabinet of the United Kingdom.

In 2002, Mercuri was asked to inspect the electronic voting machines that malfunctioned in the 2002 Florida gubernatorial election.

Mercuri was the author of a column called "Security Watch", which was published in the Communications of the Association for Computing Machinery. She was also a contributing editor to the journal from 2002–2008.

After the 2014 security breach of the United States federal government's Healthcare.gov website, Mercuri was noted in the media for the security audit she had performed the previous year, which had concluded that the website had security issues.

Mercuri was an expert witness for the defense in the trial of Roderick Vosburgh. Vosburgh was convicted and jailed. The case was notable for featuring as evidence images of internet-famous "camgirl" Loli-chan.

== Mercuri method ==
Mercuri is known for the Mercuri method, a version of a voter-verified paper audit trail. In her method, a person casts their votes on a machine which then outputs them on an enclosed paper record for verification. The electronic entry provides some of the efficiency afforded by purely electronic systems; the enclosure ensures that the votes are not electronically tampered with after being cast; and the glass safeguards the vote from being removed from the voting booth before it is deposited into the secure ballot box.
