= Shoup Voting Machine Corporation =

Defunct manufacturer of voting machines

The Shoup Voting Machine Corporation was an American manufacturer of voting machines, founded in New Jersey in 1905 by Samuel R. Shoup. It changed names and locations over the years, before going out of business as Advanced Voting Solutions, Inc. of Frisco, Texas in 2015.

== History ==
The WINvote voting machine in Arlington County, Virginia, before the discovery of severe security problems led to its decertification

Safemaker Jacob H. Meyers created the Automatic Voting Machine in 1888 and established the Automatic Voting Machine Corporation (AVM) in 1898. Samuel R. Shoup followed his example, built his own lever voting machine and founded the Shoup Voting Machine Corporation in 1905. It "operated on a limited scale", until "the development and sale of the model 2.5 in the mid 1930s turned the corporation into a successful and profitable operation." The two rivals grew to dominate the American market. By 1928, one of six citizens registered their votes on an AVM or Shoup machine. In all, Shoup sold 100,000 lever-operated voting machines, half of which were still working and in use for the 2000 presidential election. In the 1950s, the company was renamed the R. F. Shoup Corporation.

"In 1961, General Battery and Ceramic Corporation of New York incorporated ... Shoup Voting Machine Corporation." The voting machine operations were sold in 1965, and an S corporation was formed. Shoup's first foreign sale was to Trinidad in 1968. Aerospace business Macrodyne-Chatillon Corporation "acquired Shoup Voting Machines in 1969 for an estimated $6,000,000, primarily in stock." As a result of adverse publicity from criminal charges (see next section) and a "$2.3 million federal income tax lien which resulted in the Internal Revenue Service seizing certain assets", "effective March 31, 1972, Macrodyne-Chatillon wrote off its investment in, and deconsolidated, The Shoup Voting Machine Corporation (Shoup), a wholly-owned subsidiary."

Both AVM and Shoup machines used a tabular layout. In the Shoup version, each political party was assigned a column, each office a row; AVM reversed this arrangement. Most Shoup machines came with a booth for privacy that could be "collapsed into a package that was relatively easy to transport and store." Ransom F. Shoup introduced improvements between 1929 and 1975.

Lever voting machines went out of production by 1982, but continued to be employed until much later. Rhode Island used Shoup machines from 1936 into the 1990s. The first voting machines in Louisiana were from Shoup; they were employed for more than 50 years, beginning in the 1940s. It was not until January 2010 that The New York Times reported that New York City was expected to choose a replacement for its mechanical Shoup machines after "about a half century" of use.

The company was renamed Shoup Voting Solutions, Inc. in 1992 and Advanced Voting Solutions, Inc. in 2001.

In 2015, Virginia decertified all 3000 of its Advanced Voting Solutions WINvote machines after widespread publicity about previously disclosed security flaws, including a hardwired Wi-Fi password of "abcde". A wide variety of other flaws were documented in the machines, which used unpatched versions of Windows XP Embedded from 2002 that were vulnerable to a critical buffer overflow attack.

== Criminal cases ==
In July 1971, United States Attorney General John N. Mitchell announced that the Shoup Voting Machine Corp. of Philadelphia, its subsidiary Southern Municipal Sales, Inc., Shoup president Irving H. Myers, company executive vice president Martin V. Schott, several other Shoup employees, and other individuals had been indicted by a Philadelphia grand jury for a total of four indictments for bribery, mail fraud, and conspiracy. According to one indictment, "Shoup officials conspired to sell 200 machines to Hillsborough County", Florida, for $530,700 using bribery, then bought 180 back as scrap for $5,400. Another indictment charged that Shoup officials then bribed an official of Harris County, Texas, to buy 100 of them. On March 1, 1972, the Sarasota Herald-Tribune reported that Shoup had changed its plea from innocent to no contest and was fined $45,000, while a former salesman had changed his plea to guilty and received a sentence of 181 days.

In 1972, C. H. "Sammy" Downs, a former Louisiana state senator serving as his state's public works director in the administration of Governor John McKeithen, resigned when he was indicted by a federal grand jury for bribery in connection with procuring state business for the Shoup company. The firm was also indicted in the case. In the 1973 trial, the case against Downs, pushed by United States Attorney Gerald J. Gallinghouse, resulted in a hung jury.

== Memorabilia ==
A Shoup voting booth was purchased by pawnbroker Jimmy DeRamus for $800 in the reality television show Cajun Pawn Stars episode "Pawn 'n Chain".
