= Organette =

Mechanical free-reed programmable musical instrument

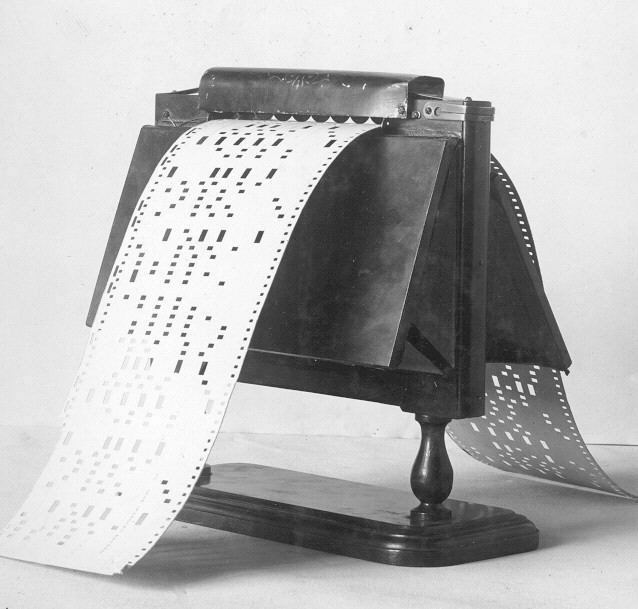
The Autophone Organette

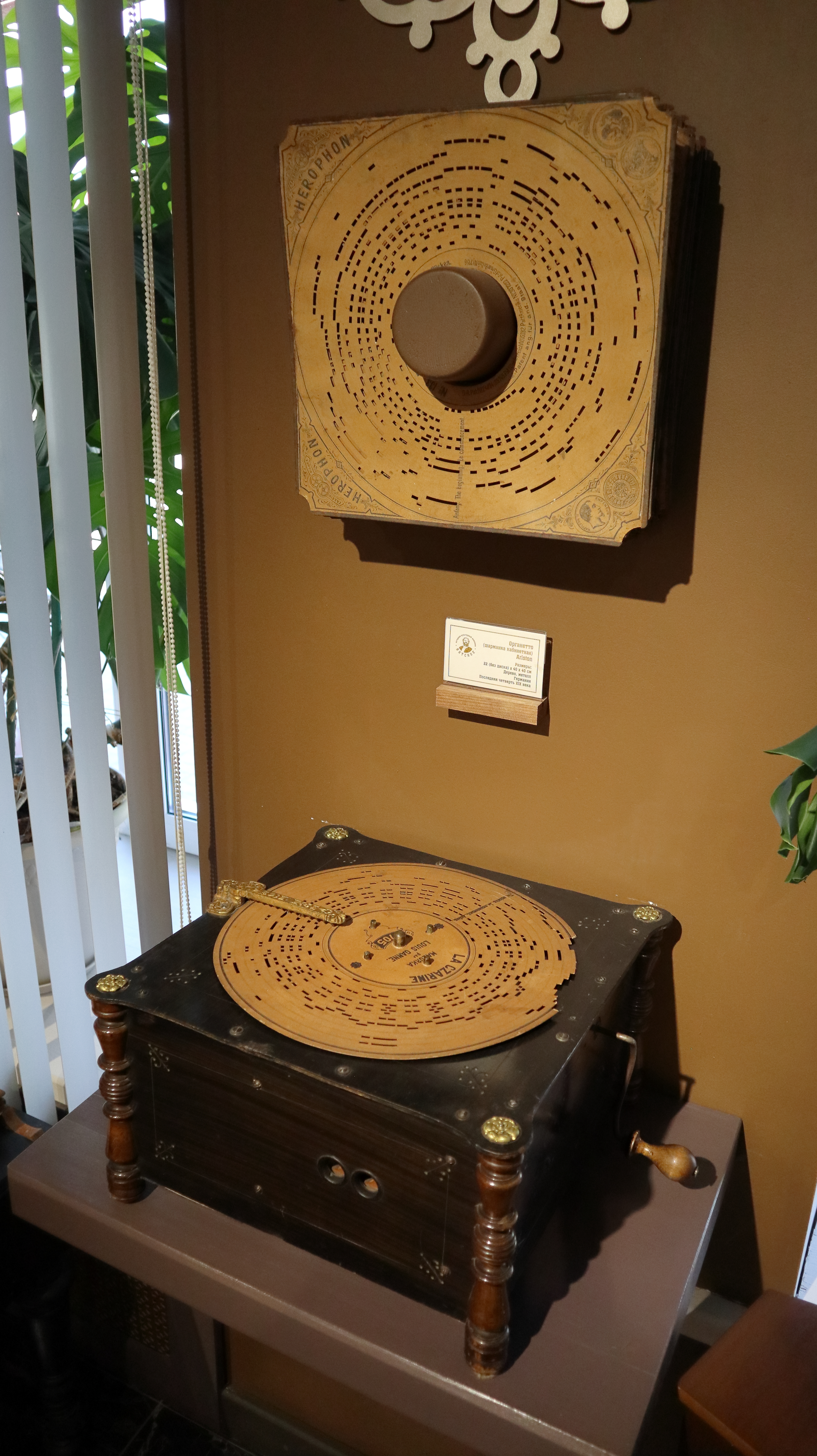
The Herophone Organette

The organette was a mechanical free-reed programmable (automatic) musical instrument first manufactured in the late 1870s by several companies such as John McTammany of Cambridge, Massachusetts, the Autophone Company of Ithaca, New York, the Automatic Organ Co of Boston, Massachusetts, E.P. Needham & Sons of New York City, J.M. Draper of Blackburn, England, Paul Ehrlich & Co. of Leipzig, Germany, and The Mechanical Orguinette Co. of New York, NY as well as other manufacturers worldwide.

The organette (or orguinette) used rolls of perforated paper, perforated cardboard, perforated metal disks and wooden rollers (or "cobs") on which the music was programmed. Musical scales ranged from 14 to 39 notes depending on the instrument's complexity. Air pressure or vacuum was produced by hand-, crank- or foot-operated mechanical bellows. The organette was compact and affordable with large selections of music available. Various patents credit Henry Bishop Horton (1819-1885; co-founder of the Ithaca Calendar Clock Co), John McTammany (1845-1915), Paul Ehrlich and others with inventing the organette. The organette's popularity declined as the phonograph was introduced and became more affordable.

The most remarkable feature of this invention is the regularity and perfection with which the music is rendered. All of the parts are played and the music is of no mean order.
Scientific American (19 November 1879)
