= John McTammany =

Scottish-born American inventor

John McTammany (c. 1845–1915) was a Scottish-born American inventor who is credited with a number of patents. He immigrated to the United States as a teenager and served in the American Civil War.

From 1880 through 1892, he focused on automatic player piano mechanisms, the free reed organette.

After 1892, McTammany's focus shifted to voting machines and automatic vote tabulators. His first voting patent was for a "pneumatic registering ballot box" that counted individual punched-card ballots as they were deposited in a ballot box, with a pneumatic mechanism very similar to the pneumatic mechanisms used in player pianos. This machine was comparable in its intended use to a precinct-count optical scan voting system. Some have described this the first voting machine based on perforations of paper. This is not the case; Kennedy Dougan patented a punched card voting system in 1890. It appears likely that McTammany's machine could tabulate votes recorded using Dougan's ballot punch.

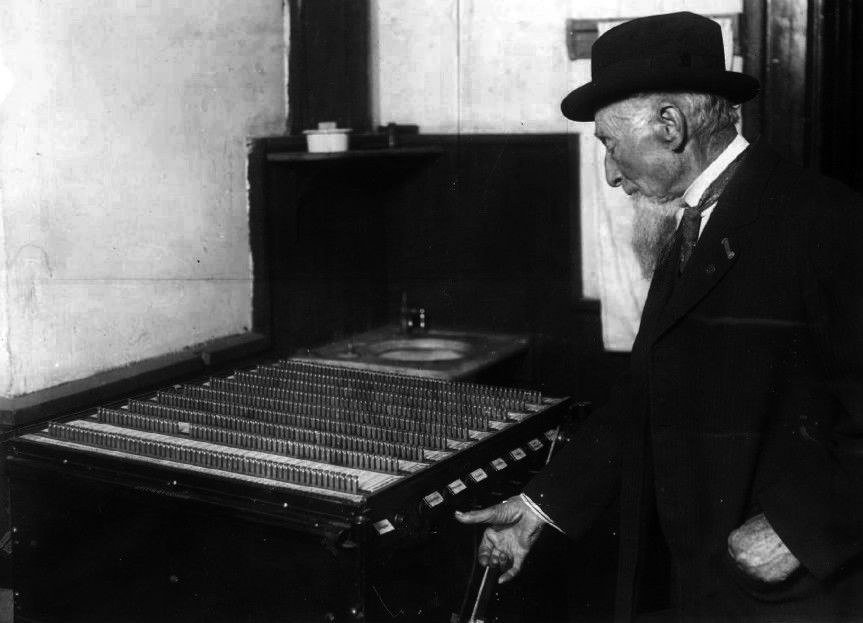
McTammany player-piano roll voting machine used in Denver, Colorado, 1912.

McTammany's later voting machines and vote tabulators recorded votes on rolls of paper much like a player piano roll instead of having a separate ballot for each voter. His first efforts in this direction involved marking the vote recording roll with a pencil and then hand counting the tick marks. Within a month, he filed a patent for an improved machine with push-button punches by each candidate's name, He patented several alternatives for supporting large numbers of candidates and offices. Votes cast on all of his punched machines could be tabulated on a pneumatic tabulator.

In 1897, McTammany filed a patent for a method of detecting overvotes during the tabulation of player-piano-roll voting records, along with an improved vote tabulator.

In their mature form, McTammany voting machines were used in a number of jurisdictions in the United States. McTammany received legislative approval for limited use of his machines in Massachusetts in 1893, but it was not until 1896 that his machines saw widespread use in that state. Connecticut approved use of the McTammany machine in 1895. In Rhode Island, the question of whether a vote on the McTammany machine met the legal definition of a ballot went all the way to the state supreme court in 1895.
