= Henry Bishop Horton =

American inventor (1819-1885)

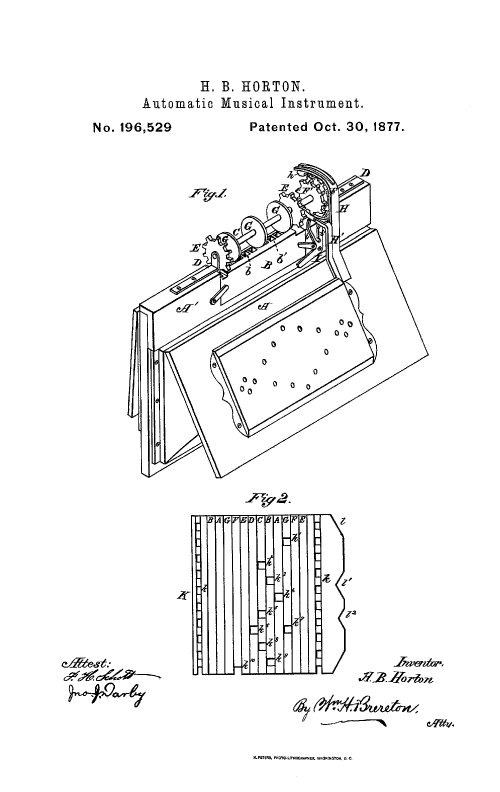
Patent 196,529 showing organette structure

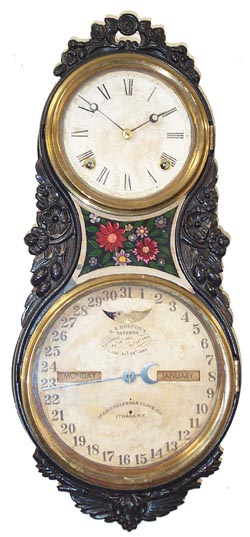
Ithaca Calendar Clock

Henry Bishop Horton (September 1, 1819, in Winchester, Connecticut – December 3, 1885, in Ithaca, New York) was an American inventor, remembered chiefly for his inventions in automatic music players and clock-making.

Around 1823, his family moved to Covert, New York, where he grew up. When Horton was 19 years old, he served for three years as a cabinet maker's apprentice under George Whiton (1801–1878). After this, he became involved in the manufacture of melopeans, instruments similar to melodeons. His taste for music showed itself at an early age and during his lifetime he invented various musical instruments, most celebrated being the organette. His first patents for the instrument were granted in 1877 and 1878, and these were followed by a device for cutting the slots in the paper rolls used in the organette. A company to manufacture this instrument was founded in 1879, where he served as its president until his retirement in 1883.

In 1864, his improvements to the calendar clock led to an 1865 patent and the formation of the Ithaca Calendar Clock Company in 1868. Their working capital was $8,000, and manufacturing accordingly started on a small scale. The clock proved a success and the business grew rapidly. A year later, the factory moved to larger quarters, continuing to grow until 1874 when a change of management saw the capital increasing to $150,000. This necessitated the construction of a large three-story brick building which burnt down in 1876, but was promptly rebuilt.

Horton died in 1885, survived by his widow, and three daughters, Mrs. J. W. Jaggar, of St. Paul, Minnesota, and Cora and Ida Horton. His grave, shared with his wife Ann E. Downing (1824–1887), is located in the Ithaca City Cemetery, and in surrounding graves are Thomas H. Horton (1848–1849), Grace D. Horton (1851–1861) and Cora A. Horton (1853–1904).
