= Optical scan voting system =

Type of voting machine

An optical scan voting system is an electronic voting machine that uses an optical scanner to read marked paper ballots and tally the results.

== History ==
=== Marksense systems ===
While mark sense technology dates back to the 1930s and optical mark recognition dates to the 1950s, these technologies were first explored in the context of standardized tests such as college entrance exams. The first suggestion to use mark sense technology to count ballots came in 1953, but practical optical scanners did not emerge until the 1960s. The Norden Electronic Vote Tallying System was the first to be deployed, but it required the use of special ink to mark the ballot. The Votronic, from 1965, was the first optical mark vote tabulator able to sense marks made with a graphite pencil.

The oldest optical-scan voting systems scan ballots using optical mark recognition scanners. Voters mark their choice in a voting response location, usually filling a rectangle, circle or oval, or by completing an arrow. Various mark-sense voting systems have used a variety of different approaches to determining what marks are counted as votes. Early systems, such as the Votronic, introduced in 1965, had a single photosensor per column of marks on the ballot. Most such tabulators, such as Optech, used analog comparators that counted all marks darker than a fixed threshold as being votes.

The use of digital imaging technology to view the ballot does not necessarily imply more sophisticated mark recognition. For example, the Avante Vote-Trakker simply counts the number of dark and light pixels in each marking area to determine if the mark counts as a vote. More sophisticated mark recognition algorithms are sensitive to the shape of the mark as well as the total overall darkness, as illustrated by the ES&S Model 100, introduced in the mid-1990s.

An example of a ballot for a Diebold/Premier AV/OS scanner.

=== Electronic ballot marker ===
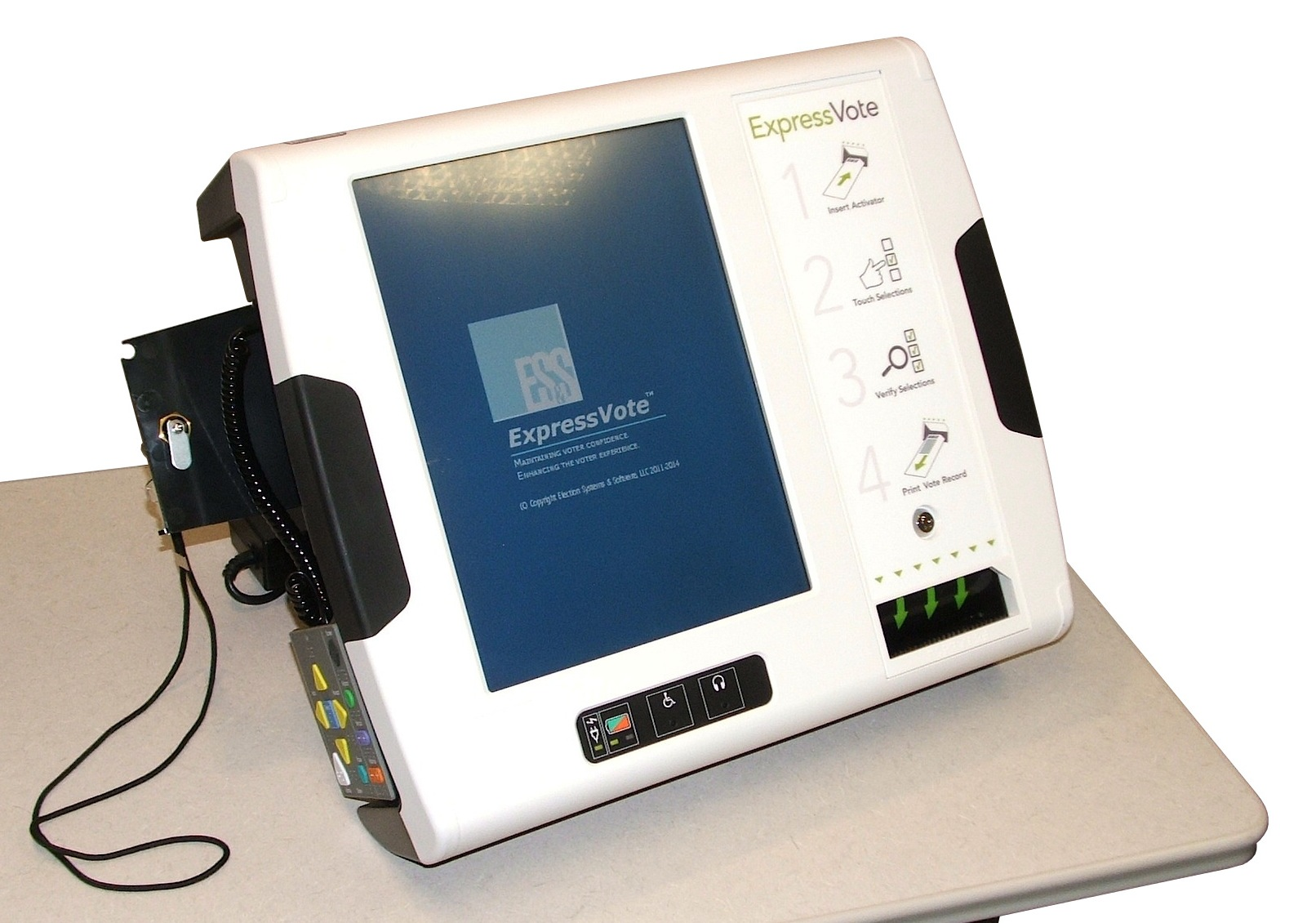
An electronic ballot marker, the ExpressVote, made by Election Systems & Software. This prints a narrow ballot containing a summary of votes cast in both human-readable and bar code form.

An electronic ballot marker (EBM) or ballot marking device (BMD) is a device that can aid voters in marking paper ballots. Typical ballot markers include a touch screen and a variety of assistive devices to serve the needs of voters with disabilities.

In 1991, Julien Anno and others filed a patent application for a device resembling a modern electronic ballot marker, with an emphasis on multilingual ballot presentation, not accessibility. The Jites and Digivote systems used in Belgium are similar to this, although they use magnetic stripe cards instead of bar codes to record the ballot. Eugene Cummings filed a patent for an electronic ballot marker specifically designed as an accessible voting interface for optical-scan voting systems in 2003. This machine, the Automark, saw widespread use in the United States.

Capital costs and 10 years of maintenance are $11 to $12 per voter for central count systems, if most voters mark their own ballots and one electronic ballot marker is available at each polling place for voters with disabilities, or $23 to $29 per voter if all voters use electronic ballot markers. In the first option, there are also costs for commercial printers to print ballots in all languages needed, with enough extra for the highest possible turnout. In the second option, there is cost for paper and for the electronic ballot marker to print just the ballots used, which means fewer ballots. A New York study assumed equal printing cost per ballot, while a Georgia study assumed $0.10 per ballot to print on demand and $0.40 to $0.55 for commercial printing. If most voters get ballots by mail, these need to be printed commercially, and polling place costs will be at the low end.

=== Digital pen voting systems ===
Digital pen voting systems use ballots on digital paper which is recognized by a small camera in the pen while it is marked by the voter. The ballots are collected in a ballot box and the digital pen is returned to an election official for tabulation.

This technology was expected to be used in the 2008 Hamburg state elections, but eventually was decided against due to controversy surrounding the accuracy of voting tallies.

The technology was first used by the town of Menstrie, Clackmannanshire Scotland in their 2006 local community council elections.

== Optical scan process ==
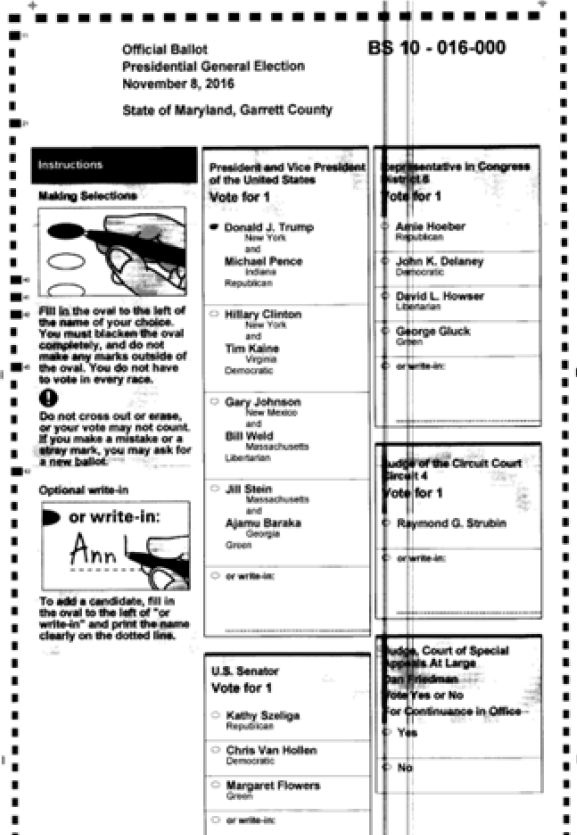
Scanner created image with black line implying votes for multiple candidates

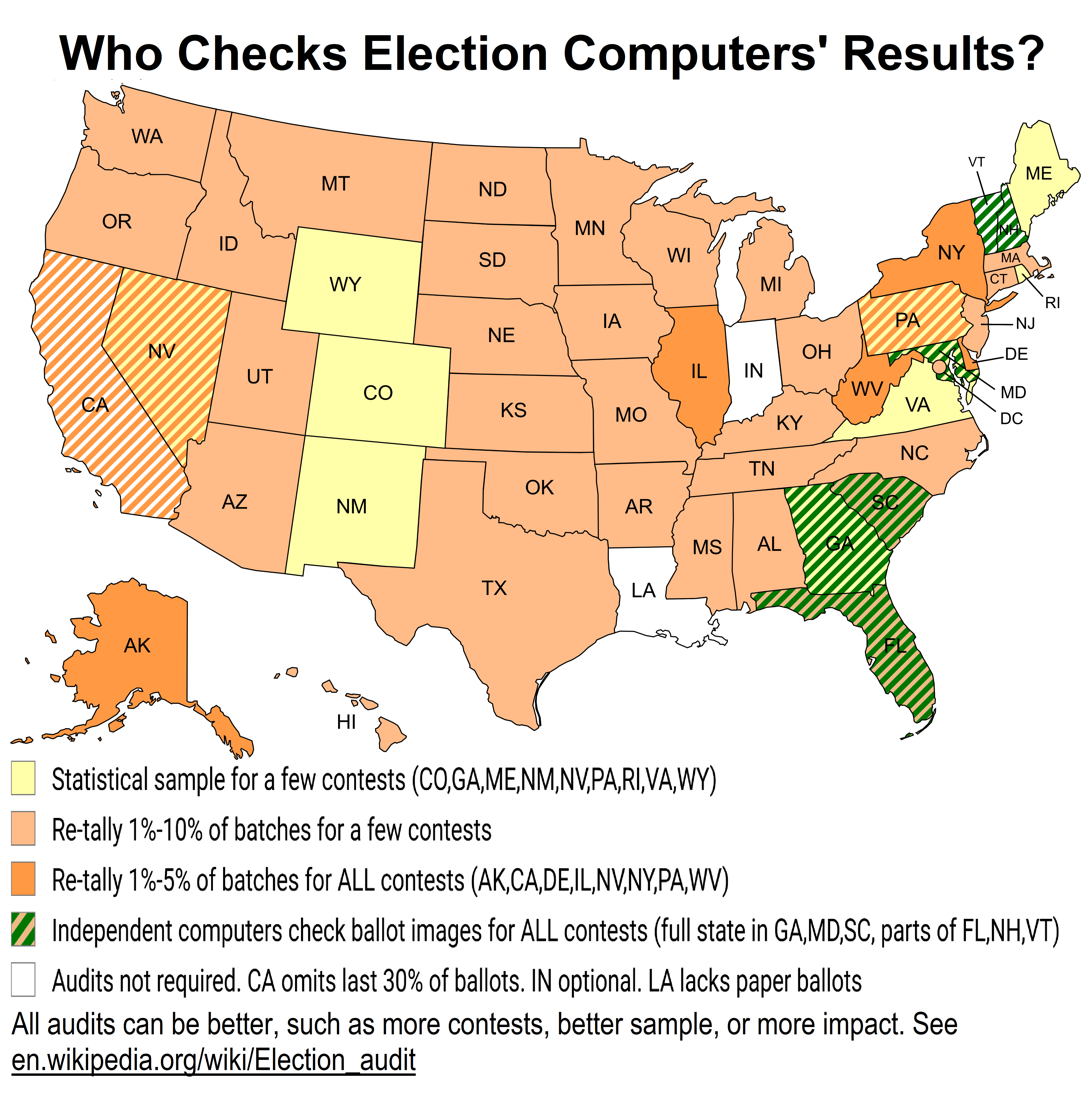
Some States Check Election Machines' Counts by Hand

The scanner's sensors detect black and white pixels on the paper ballot, at least in the areas designated for marking votes. The scanner's processor interprets the results from the sensors, creates a tally for each candidate, and usually stores the image for later review. The ballot is sometimes immediately interpreted at polling stations allowing for voters to be notified by the voting system of voting errors such as an overvote and some types of spoilt votes. This is known as a precinct-count voting system. Alternately the ballots can be collected in the polling station and tabulated later at a central facility, known as a central-count voting system.

Ballots which are torn or otherwise fail to scan are copied by election staff, and the copies are scanned.

The scanning machines are faster than hand-counting for long ballots, so are typically used during the election and the night afterwards, to give quick results. There is less speed advantage in parliamentary systems where the member of parliament is the only contest on a ballot, so hand counting is fast and reliable. The paper ballots and electronic memories are stored, so election audits can check if the images and tallies are correct, and so investigations or court challenges can examine them. The advantage of scanning systems over direct-recording electronic voting machines is the availability of paper records for audits and investigations, and if electronic ballot markers are not required, voters do not need to wait for a machine during busy times.

Hundreds of errors in optical scan systems have been found, from feeding ballots upside down, multiple ballots pulled through at once in central counts, paper jams, broken, blocked or overheated sensors which misinterpret some or many ballots, printing which does not align with the programming, programming errors, and loss of files. The cause of each programming error is rarely found, so it is not known how many were accidental or intentional.

Besides scanner problems, paper ballots are subject to traditional risks, such as ballot box stuffing, ballot destruction and vote buying. These have traditional prevention measures. To address these issues, some have also suggested End-to-end auditable voting systems such as Scantegrity.

== Machine manufacturers ==
- In the United States:
  - Premier Election Solutions (formerly Diebold Election Systems)
  - Election Systems & Software (ES&S)
  - Smartmatic
  - Sequoia Voting Systems
  - Hart InterCivic
  - AVANTE International Technology, Inc.
  - Unisyn Voting Solutions
- In Canada:
  - Dominion Voting Systems
- In China:
  - EKEMP INT'L LIMITED

== See also ==
- DRE voting machine
- Electronic voting
  - Electronic voting#Paper-based electronic voting system
  - Electronic voting in the United States#Optical scan counting
- Prêt à Voter
- Punchscan
- Scantegrity
- Vote counting#Optical scan counting
- Voting machine
  - Voting machine#Optical scan (marksense)
