= Vav =

Vav or VAV may refer to:

== Places ==
- Vav, Gujarat, a city and taluka in Gujarat
- Vav State, a princely state in Banas Kantha (Kathiawar) named after its above capital
- Vav (Vidhan Sabha constituency), Gujarat

== Other ==
- Vote-Antivote-Vote, a variant of ThreeBallot
- Vav (letter), a Semitic letter
- Vav (protein)
- VAV (band), a South Korean boy band
- Variable air volume, used in HVAC systems
- Varli language (ISO 639 code: vav), a language of India
- Victor and Valentino, Cartoon Network's animated television series
- Vis-à-vis (disambiguation)
- Stepwell, called vav in Gujarati and Marwari
