= Optical scanning =

Optical scanning can refer to:

- an optical reader
- a 3D scanner
