= University Voting Systems Competition =

The University Voting Systems Competition, or VoComp is an annual competition in which teams of students design, implement, and demonstrate open-source election systems. The systems are presented to a panel of security expert judges. The winners are awarded a cash prize provided by the sponsors. The competition was started by a group of students and professors from UMBC and George Washington University to inspire better ideas for electronic voting technology and raise student awareness of the political process.

== Competitions ==
=== 2006/2007 academic year ===
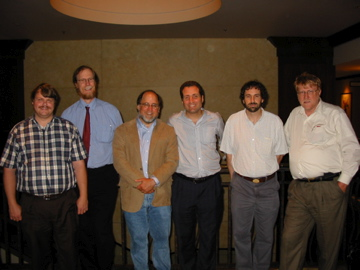
VoComp 2007 Judges. (left to right:) John Kelsey, Doug Jones, Ron Rivest, Eric Lazarus, Josh Benaloh, and Paul Miller

The first competition took place on July 16–19 during the 2006/2007 academic year in Portland, Oregon. The event was sponsored by The National Science Foundation, Election Systems & Software, and Hewlett-Packard Company. The four teams that competed were:

- The Prêt-à-Voter Battle Bus from University of Surrey,
- The Voting Ducks from Wroclaw University of Technology,
- Prime III from Auburn University, and
- Punchscan a team consisting of members from George Washington University, University of Ottawa, and University of Maryland, Baltimore County.

The judging panel included MIT professor Ron Rivest, Microsoft security researcher Josh Benaloh and John Kelsey of NIST.

The Punchscan team was awarded the "Best-Election System" grand prize and $10,000 from ES&S after uncovering a security flaw in the random number generator in the source code of the runner-up team, Prêt à Voter.

== See also ==
- List of computer science awards
- Prêt à Voter
- Punchscan
