= Tally (voting) =

Unofficial observation of an election count

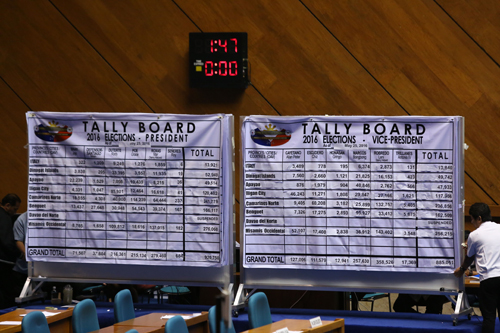
A tally board is used for elections in the Philippines

A tally is an unofficial private observation of an election count carried out under the single transferable vote electoral system. Tallymen, appointed by political candidates and parties, observe the opening of ballot boxes and watch as the individual ballot papers are counted. Individual tallymen may be placed to observe the opening of each box and watch as separate bundles of ballot papers are sorted, stacked and counted. They record their estimation of counts by marking votes for each candidate on their 'tally sheet' as a tick (/) which are then assembled together to produce a full prediction of what the likely outcome of the result will be. Many political parties, having been rival during elections, co-operate in producing a tally.

Tally results are then released to the media before a formal account may even have begun, allowing predictions as to how some, or in most cases all, the seats in multi-member constituencies, may go hours in advance of the official count, by noting how many number 1s a candidate may get, who gets their number 2s, whether voters vote for one party or spread their first, second, third, fourth etc. preferences randomly, by party, by alphabet, by local area, or by some other criteria. In the Republic of Ireland, a national prediction of an election outcome may be made on RTÉ by lunchtime on count day, before a single seat has officially been filled.

Tally results are used after the elections by political parties to work out, on the basis of from which ballot box the tally came, how many votes they picked up in a particular area, or even a particular street. The planned introduction in the Republic of Ireland of electronic voting for the 2004 local elections was expected to lead to the demise of the tally system. However, widespread criticism of the electronic voting programme has meant that a hand-count remains in operation in Ireland. Tally predictions and long complex counts have given election outcomes on television and radio much of their appeal, making election results coverage, which may last from 15 hours to days, depending on the closeness of an election, producing a form of spectator sport watched by vast viewerships.
