= Safevote =

Safevote Inc. is a U.S. company with proprietary voting technology and global internet election experience. Safevote is privately held, with the majority of capital in the U.S. Safevote's voting technology has been used with the internet, offline, and in combination, in the private and public sectors. The technology has been used in legally binding elections in Africa, Brazil, France, Germany, Holland, Sweden, United Kingdom, and United States for hundreds of thousands of voters, and an official public-voting shadow election test in the United States 2000 election (in Contra Costa County, California) for 307 voters.

== Reception ==
Safevote contributed to the non-partisan voting newsletter "The Bell", which last edition was issued in February 2001, and is available online.

== Publications ==
- "The Witness-Voting System", by Ed Gerck, invited opening chapter in "Towards Trustworthy Elections, New Directions in Electronic Voting", published by Springer Verlag. Chaum, David, et al. (Ed.), (c) 2010, pages 1–36. ISBN 1-4020-7301-1.
- "Private, Secure And Auditable Internet Voting", by Ed Gerck, in the book "Secure Electronic Voting", published by Kluwer/Spring, Gritzalis, Dimitris (Ed.), 2003, 240 p. ISBN 1-4020-7301-1.
- "The Business of Electronic Voting" panel with Ed Gerck, C. Andrew Neff, Ronald L. Rivest, Aviel D. Rubin, and Moti Yung, p. 243-268, Paul F. Syverson (Ed.): Financial Cryptography, 5th International Conference, FC 2001, Grand Cayman, British West Indies, February 19–22, 2002, Proceedings, Lecture Notes in Computer Science 2339 Springer 2002, ISBN 3-540-44079-8.

== See also ==
- Election technology
