= Voting rights in Belgium =

The duty to vote in Belgium belongs to all adult Belgians. EU citizens can vote in European and municipal elections. Other foreigners have local voting rights when they have lived in the country for more than five years. Voting attendance is compulsory for Belgians in Belgium. Not voting can result in a fine, and 3 fines equals the loss of civil rights.

== Overview ==
All Belgians of age (+18) have the right to vote. They are automatically placed on the electoral rolls by the municipal authorities from the National Register. The municipal administration sends a voter invitation card to all eligible voters.

Voting is compulsory for Belgians in Belgium. All Belgian citizens (who are eligible to vote) have to participate in the voting, but they are allowed to vote blank.

EU citizens from the age of 18 living in Belgium can register to vote in European and municipal elections. Non-EU citizens can only register to vote in municipal elections if they have lived in Belgium for at least five years. The latter migrant voting right was introduced in 2004 after intense political debate.

Belgian citizens living abroad can register at a diplomatic or consular post in their country of residence to vote in European and federal elections. Registration is not compulsory for them, but once registered they do fall under the compulsory attendance.

Elections for	Flemish people in Belgium	Other Belgians in Belgium	Foreigners residing in Belgium		Belgians residing abroad	
Elections for	Flemish people in Belgium	Other Belgians in Belgium	EU citizens	Non-EU citizens	In an EU country	In a non-EU country
Electorate	7,975,658 voters (as of 1 August 2018)		130,559 registered 17.5% of 748,267 eligible (as of 1 August 2018)	29,557 registered 15.2% of 194,593 eligible (as of 1 August 2018)	128,902 registered (as of 1 March 2014)	
European parliament	Compulsory		May register to vote	Not allowed	May register to vote	
Chamber of Representatives	Compulsory		Not allowed		May register to vote	
Community and Regional Parliaments	Compulsory		Not allowed			
Provincial councils	Voluntary	Compulsory	Not allowed			
Municipal councils	Voluntary	Compulsory	May register to vote	May register to vote	Not allowed	

== History ==
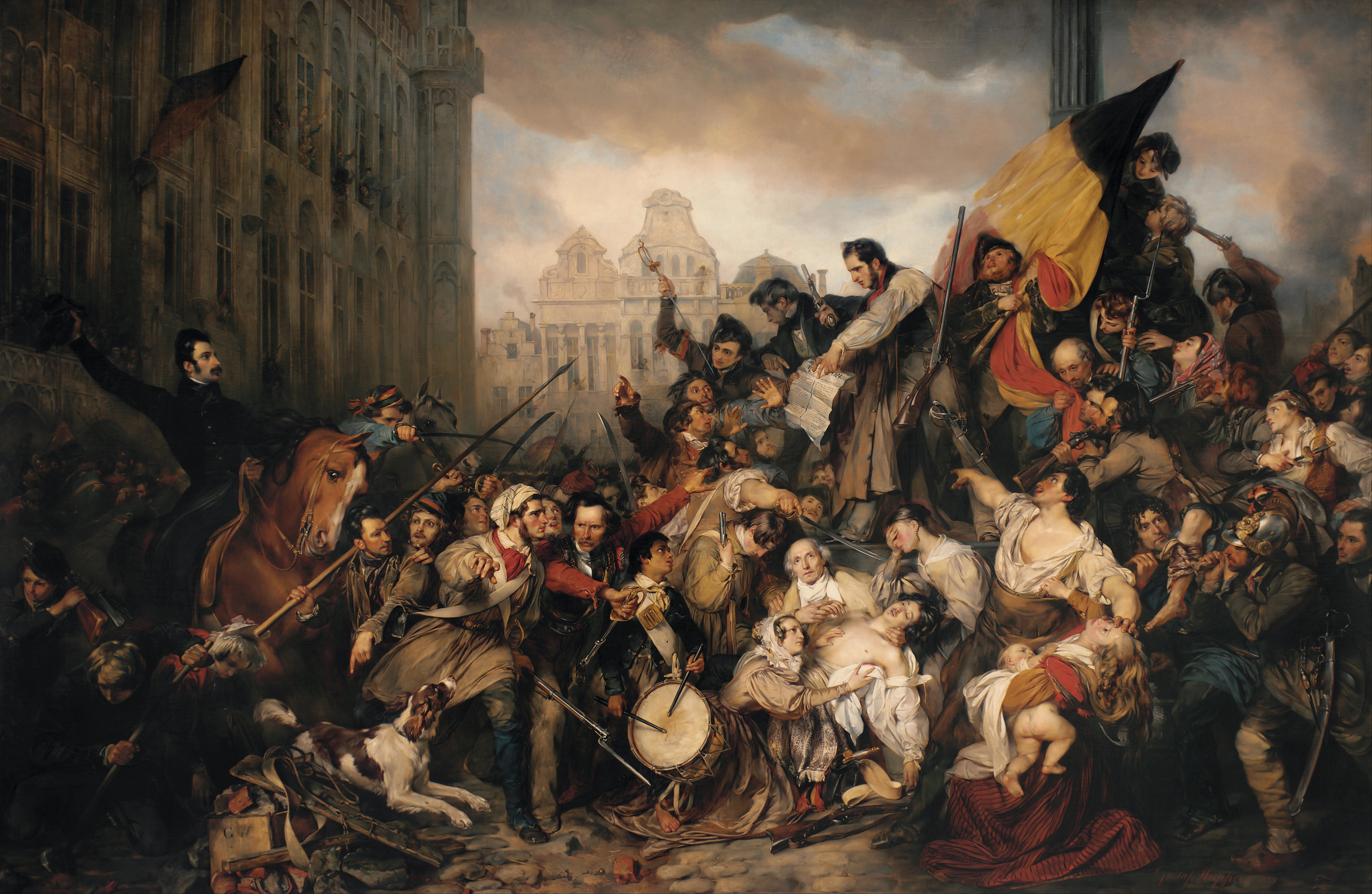
Scene of the September Days 1830 on the Grand Place in Brussels is a painting by the Belgian painter Gustave Wappers. It shows the moment when the Belgian Declaration of Independence is read to the people of Brussels.

=== 1831–1893: Census suffrage for men ===
Census suffrage was in force since the creation of the Belgian state in 1831. The electoral system was written down in the Constitution of February 7, 1831 and the Election law was written on March 3, 1831. Only male citizens above 25 years old who paid a certain amount of tax had the right to vote, meaning in the national elections of 1831 only 46,000 Belgians were entitled to vote for the Chamber. In fact, only 400 people were up for election for the 51 national mandates of senators. In the beginning, the Belgian political landscape consisted only of Catholics and liberals, with no real developed party structure. Only later were the Liberal Party (1846) and the Catholic Party (1869) founded.

On March 12, 1848, a law was made that lowered the tax and made the terms uniform throughout the country. The cumulation of the mandate of representative of the people or senator with an official function was also excluded. Finally, by law of July 9, 1877, the voting became secret.

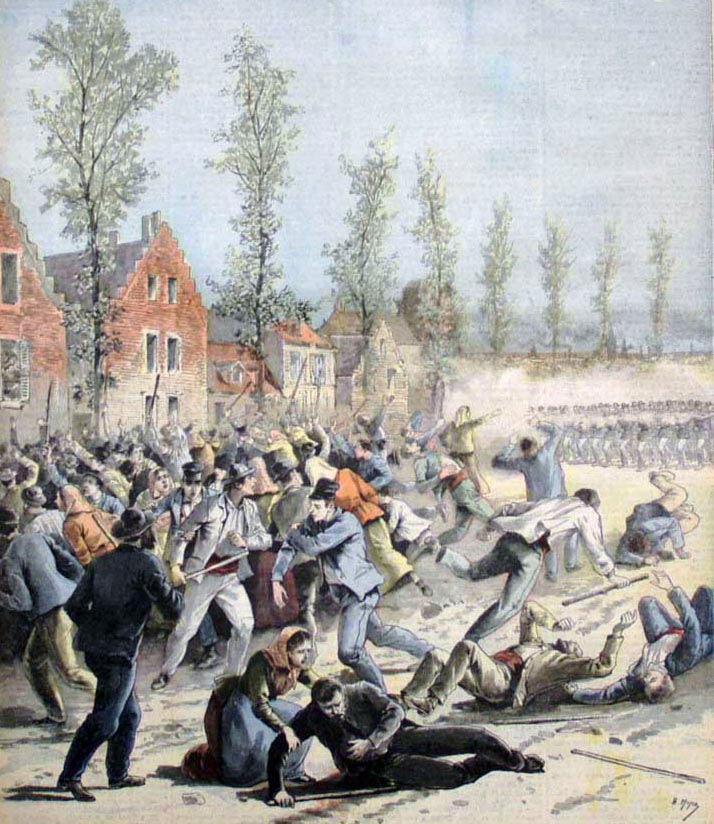
Troops of the paramilitary Garde Civique fire on strikers near Mons on 17 April 1893.

=== 1893–1918: Plural compulsory voting for all men ===
After bloody strikes in Wallonia and pressure from the liberal progressists and the socialists, general plural voting rights were introduced in 1893 under the Beernaert government. As a result, every male Belgian citizen of 25 years or older had at least one vote, one or two additional votes were possible either depending on his education, or according to the taxes he paid, or a combination of both. The number of eligible voters increased tenfold from 137,772 to 1,370,687, with 853,628 voters having 1 vote, 293,679 voters having 2 votes and 223,381 having 3 votes. In total, 2,111,127 votes could be cast, with a minority of 517,060 voters (37.7%) holding a majority of 1,257,499 votes (59.6%).

Compulsory voting was introduced and the voting age was set at 25 years. Provincial senators were also elected for the first time.

The first elections under this system took place on October 14, 1894, with the recently founded Belgian Workers' Party entering parliament for the first time with 28 seats. Despite these reforms, the Workers' Party continued to advocate general single suffrage.

==== Criteria for additional votes ====
An additional vote was possible for heads of households aged 35 or older who paid at least 5 Belgian francs in tax, owners of a building worth at least 2,000 francs or owners of savings accounts or government debt securities worth at least 100 francs. Two additional votes were awarded to holders of an upper secondary education diploma or higher.

=== 1921–1948: Universal male suffrage ===
After the First World War, drastic changes in the political system were unstoppable. After the so-called Loppem Coup, King Albert I promised in his 1918 Speech from the Throne to introduce voting reform to suppress the pre-war system of plural voting. This normally required a constitutional amendment, but they already wanted the next elections to take place under the new system. Under an ordinary law of May 9, 1919, the voting age was lowered from 25 to 21, each man had only one vote, and co-opted senators were elected for the first time. This was a measure that mainly favored the Catholics and the Socialists. The newly elected parliament made a constitutional amendment in 1920–1921 to regularize the situation.

Whereas general single suffrage was hardly controversial for men, the situation was different for women. Liberals and socialists, despite the latter's support, feared that this would only strengthen the dominant position of Catholics because they believed that women were too much under the influence of the Church. The compromise was to make women compulsory to vote in municipal elections, which was done by law of April 15, 1920, and to provide the possibility of introducing this later for parliamentary elections with a law requiring a two-thirds majority.

=== 1948–present: Universal suffrage ===
After the Second World War, the zeitgeist had progressed to such an extent that full women's suffrage had become inevitable. Under the law of March 27, 1948, women were allowed to vote and were also allowed to stand for parliamentary elections; a few months later this followed for provincial council elections. On June 26, 1949, all women could participate in parliamentary elections for the first time.

Women still remained underrepresented in the Chamber of Representatives and Senate relative to their share of the population. To reverse this situation, a system of affirmative action through gender quotas was introduced that stated that half of each electoral list must be made up of women. The first three places on the list must also include at least one person of the opposite sex.

== Age reductions through the years ==
Gradually, the age requirement for active and passive suffrage was lowered for all levels:

- By law of 1 July 1969, the voting age (active suffrage) for municipal councils was lowered from 21 to 18 years.
- In 1981, under the Eyskens government, the age for parliamentary elections was also lowered from 21 to 18. This was first applied in the elections of November 8, 1981.
- The law of 9 June 1982 set the age of eligibility (passive suffrage) at 21 for municipal elections.
- The law of 7 January 1991 lowered the age of eligibility for municipal elections from 21 to 18.
- The constitutional amendment of February 1, 1991 lowered the age of eligibility for the Chamber from 25 to 21.
- The constitutional amendment of May 5, 1993 lowered the age of eligibility for the Senate from 40 to 21.
- The special law of 2 March 2004 (amendment BWHI = Bijzondere Wet tot Hervorming der Instellingen) lowered the age of eligibility for state parliaments from 21 to 18 years.
- The constitutional amendment of 6 January 2014 further lowered the eligibility age for the Chamber and Senate from 21 to 18 years.

As in other countries, it is now proposed to lower the voting age from 18 to 16. In May 2017, an amendment to introduce this for municipal elections in Flanders was considered in the Flemish Parliament. CD&V, Open Vld, Vooruit (previously Sp.a) and Groen are in favour, but the ruling party, N-VA, opposed this. In January 2018, a bill (from Ecolo) for voting rights from the age of 16 in municipal elections was also rejected in the Parliament of Wallonia by MR, cdH and PS.

In 2021, the De Croo-government plans to introduce voting rights for 16 and 17-year-olds in the European Parliament elections.

Only for the European Parliament elections is the required age 16. All other age requirements, both active and passive, have been set at 18 years since the above changes.

== Voting rights for foreigners in Belgium ==
With the introduction of European citizenship through the Maastricht Treaty in 1992, it became a European obligation to allow EU citizens to vote in municipal elections. By law of January 27, 1999, EU citizens in Belgium were given this right to vote.

The law of 19 March 2004 also introduced active and passive migrant voting rights for non-European foreigners who have resided in Belgium legally for at least five years for the municipal elections. However, they are excluded from the mandate of mayor and aldermen.

Non-Belgians are therefore not allowed to participate in federal, regional and provincial council elections. Foreigners' right to vote does apply for district council elections (in Antwerp) but not for the direct election of OCMW councils in the eight special municipalities with facilities.

== Voting rights for Belgians abroad ==
The law of December 18, 1998 gave Belgians residing abroad the right to vote on the elections of the federal parliament (Chamber and Senate). However, this law was cumbersome and expensive for Belgians abroad and was therefore hardly ever applied.

The law of 7 March 2002 simplified the procedure; however, still only for federal elections. A Belgian abroad could register as a voter in a Belgian municipality of his choice. In practice, most opted for the Community-sensitive constituency of Brussels-Halle-Vilvoorde. Once registered, the voter is in principle subject to compulsory attendance. The Butterfly Agreement replaced this free choice with an objectively determined municipality, namely the municipality where the person was last registered in the population register.

The Michel I government wanted to extend this right to vote (for Belgians abroad) to European and regional elections. By the law of 17 November 2016, this was implemented for the European elections.

== Abolition of compulsory attendance ==
In 2019–2020, the Flemish Jambon Government planned to abolish compulsory voting for municipal and provincial elections in Flanders. This was implemented with the decree of 16 July 2021 and was applied for the first time in the 2024 local elections. Voting is still mandatory for all first-order elections (EU, federal, and regional levels), and at the local level in Wallonia and Brussels.

== See also ==
- Elections in Belgium
- Electronic voting in Belgium
- Political parties in Belgium
- Political parties in Flanders
- Elections to the European Parliament
