= Farnel =

Farnel—this word means basket in Portuguese—is a paper based voting protocol conceived by Ricardo Felipe Custódio in 2001. His master student Augusto Jun Devegili was responsible for the name and for the first electronic version of the protocol. Roberto Araujo takes Farnel and has proposed several improvements on it. He also did his master thesis at Computer Security Laboratory (LabSEC - http://www.labsec.ufsc.br) managed by prof. Custódio.

== Short description ==
The Farnel paper-based voting scheme is based on signatures and employs two ballot boxes. One of the ballot boxes (the first one) is able to receive ballots, shuffle its contents, and output ballots; this ballot box is initialized before the election with votes signed by a voting authority. The other ballot box (the second one) begins the election empty. The voting phase is described as following:

1. The voter receives a blank ballot signed by the voting authority, marks her option, and casts it into the first ballot box;

2. The ballot box shuffles its ballots and returns a random ballot to the voter;

3. To finish the process, the voter signs the ballot received and casts it into the second ballot box.

In the tally phase, the ballots from the first ballot box are signed by the authority and cast into the second ballot box. To obtain the voting results, all ballots of this ballot box are counted and the ballots cast before the voting are discounted.

See “A Verifiable Voting Protocol based on Farnel” and “An electronic scheme for the Farnel paper-based voting protocol” for more details about the scheme. These papers are available at http://www.cdc.informatik.tu-darmstadt.de/mitarbeiter/rsa.html

== Summary of the work related to Farnel ==
The Farnel paper-based scheme was developed in the LabSec (http://www.labsec.ufsc.br) at the Universidade Federal de Santa Catarina – Brazil – in 2001. It was first presented at the “3o. Simpósio de Segurança da Informação” (https://web.archive.org/web/20070704045428/http://www.ssi.org.br/) - Brazil - in 2001. Though, it was never published as a paper and there are just unpublished notes about it.

From the paper-based Farnel scheme, other works were accomplished. Augusto Devegilli proposed the first electronic version of the Farnel in his Master Thesis (https://web.archive.org/web/20070927194713/http://www.labsec.ufsc.br/tiki-index.php?page=Dissertacao-Augusto-Devegili-abstract). In the same year, Fabiano Castro and Carlo Mazzi presented an implementation of the Farnel in their Undergraduate Thesis (https://web.archive.org/web/20070927194736/http://www.labsec.ufsc.br/tiki-index.php?page=Fabiano-Mazzi-TCC-abstract). In 2002 Roberto Araujo presented an improved electronic version of the Farnel in his Master Thesis (https://web.archive.org/web/20070927194728/http://www.labsec.ufsc.br/tiki-index.php?page=Dissertacao-Roberto-Samarone-abstract); This new version was also published in the “II Workshop em Segurança de Sistemas Computacionais” (WSEG) – Brazil - jointly with Custodio and Devegilli. In 2006, Roberto Araujo et al. proposed a new electronic version of the Farnel and also described the paper-based version of it.
