= Ballot marking device =

Type of voting machine

A ballot marking device (BMD) or vote recorder is a type of voting machine used by voters to record votes on physical ballots. In general, ballot marking devices neither store nor tabulate ballots, but only allow the voter to record votes on ballots that are then stored and tabulated elsewhere.

The first ballot marking device emerged in the late 19th century, but were only widely used starting in the 1960s. Today, electronic ballot markers (EBMs) have come into widespread use as assistive devices in the context of optical scan voting systems. In the context of paper ballots, pens and pencils are used to record votes on ballots, but they are general-purpose items.

== Terminology: BMD or EBM? ==
There is no consensus about the terminology used to refer to ballot marking devices or electronic ballot markers, and where a jurisdiction uses one term, there is frequently no reference to the other. For example, Hart InterCivic and the state of Colorado only list BMD and ballot marking device in their glossaries. The Minnesota and IEEE P 1622 glossaries, on the other hand, refer to EBM and electronic ballot marker (or electronically-assisted ballot marker). The Canadian government appears to prefer the term assistive voting device.

These terms are not, strictly speaking, synonyms. Ballot marking device defines a broad category, while electronic ballot marker excludes older mechanical devices, and assistive voting device only applies when the device serves as an assistive device.

== History ==
=== Punched cards ===
The first ballot marking devices specifically designed for use in elections emerged in the late 19th century along with proposals to use various punched-card ballot forms. Kennedy Dougan filed for patents on a punched-card system using a ballot marking device in 1890. Urban Iles filed a proposal for a more sophisticated system in 1892. The patents for these machines suggest that their primary goal was to provide for mechanical vote tabulation while retaining paper ballots that could be used to verify the operation of the tabulator in the event of any question. The punched cards used by these early machines were not designed to be compatible with any other data processing equipment.

In 1937, Frank Carrell, working for IBM applied for a patent on a ballot marking device that recorded on standard punched cards. This was incorporated into a full-sized voting booth with voter interface that resembled a mechanical voting machine, but recording on ballot cards that could be tabulated on standard punched-card tabulating machines.

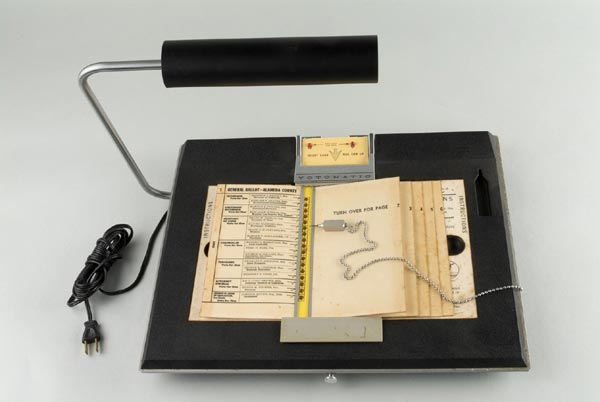
A Votomatic vote recorder.

None of these machines was commercially successful. The first commercially successful ballot marking device was the Votomatic. This was based on the Port-A-Punch, a handheld device for recording data on pre-scored punched cards. Joseph Harris filed his first patent on what would become the Votomatic in 1962.

Ballot cards punched on a Votomatic could be tabulated by standard punched card tabulating machines or sorted on card sorters. The machines cost only $185 each in 1965 dollars, and weighed only 6 pounds. This was one of the first machines to attract serious thinking about accessibility; John Ahmann filed for a patent on a punching stylus for the Votomatic adapted for use by voters with motor disabilities in 1986. IBM marketed the Votomatic until 1968, when it spun off Computer Election Systems Inc. to produce and market the system. By 1980, the Votomatic system was used by over 29% of U.S. voters. By 1992, the Votomatic had replaced mechanical voting machines as the dominant voting system used in the United States. The dominance of the Votomatic ended abruptly following the Florida election recount of 2000.

One of the major benefits of the Votomatic was that the machines were inexpensive enough that a polling place could have several machines, each with a ballot label printed in a different language.

=== Magnetic stripe and smart cards ===
The needs of minority voters also drove the development of electronic voting in Belgium. In 1991, a Belgian, Julien Anno working with a group from Texas Instruments filed a patent application for an electronic ballot marker. The Jites and Digivote systems used in Belgium are similar to this, although they use magnetic stripe cards instead of the bar codes used in the TI patent to record the ballot. Belgium continues to use ballot marking devices, although the new machines use thermal printers to print human readable text along with a machine-readable bar code.

The AIS "Sailau" voting system developed in Belarus and Kazakhstan is conceptually similar to the Belgian system, except that it records votes on smart cards instead of bar codes or magnetic stripe cards.

=== Full face ballots ===
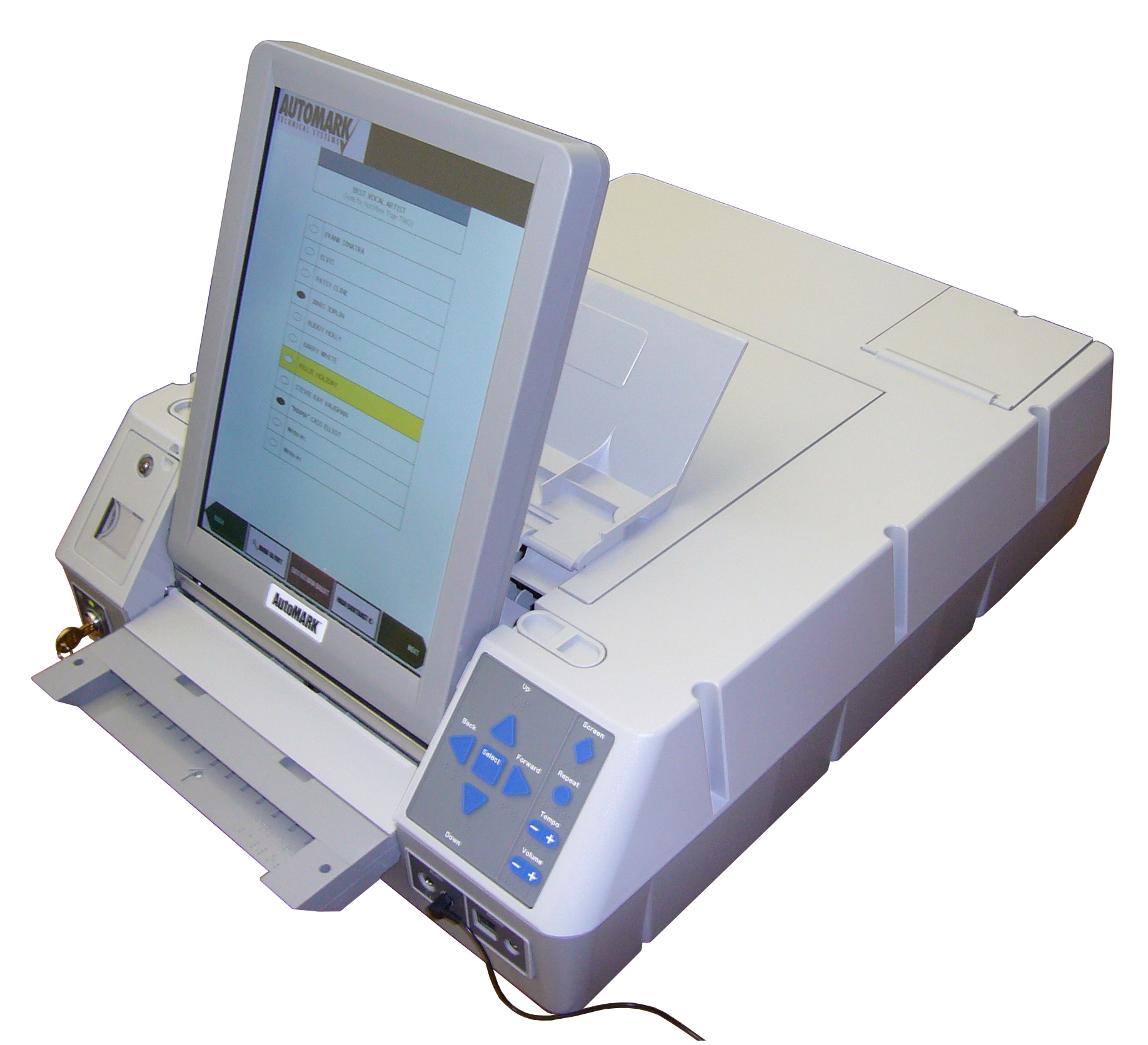
An AutoMARK ballot marking device.

The passage of the Help America Vote Act in 2002 required new voting systems to be accessible. This led Eugene Cummings to file for a patent in 2003 on a machine that became the AutoMARK. This machine has a touch screen, tactile keyboard, and headphone jack, as well as support for several other assistive devices, and it records votes on ballots used by several widely used optical scan voting systems. By 2016, the AutoMARK was used statewide in 10 states in the United States, and widely used in 19 additional states.

Other systems which print ballots in the same size and layout as hand-marked ballots, include Avante, ClearAccess, Dominion ICX though full face can be turned off, and Verity Touch.

=== Bar codes ===
Sanford Morganstein also filed for a ballot-marking device patent in 2003, primarily motivated by the desire for a voter-verified paper audit trail. Morganstein founded Populex Corporation to commercialize this system, and by 2004, the system was brought to market, certified to meet the 2002 Voting System Standards. Like Julien Anno's ballot marking device proposal, the Populex system prints a compact summary ballot containing a bar code that is scanned as the voter drops the ballot in the ballot box. Unlike Anno's system, however, the Populex system also prints a human-readable summary on the ballot for voter verification. Morganstein's system never achieved deep market penetration, although it was used in Worth County, Missouri in 2012.

=== Voter verification ===
One strength of punched card ballots is that, voters can, in principle, verify that the punches on the ballots correspond to the choices the voter intended, though this is difficult. In the case of the Belgian magnetic-stripe cards and Kazakh smart cards, independent voter verification of the contents of the ballot card is impossible.

Several other ballot marking devices have come on the market to compete with the AutoMARK. All of these print human readable content on paper ballots, but in several cases, these machines follow the Populex model by adding a machine-readable bar code. Voters cannot easily verify that the bar code matches the human-readable print, but in an audit, a hand count of the human-readable ballots can be compared with a machine count of the bar-coded content to verify that the electronic ballot marker was honest.

It has been noted that the information incorporated into the barcode or QR code may not match the human-readable information printed on the ballots, and it would be impossible to determine if that is the case without audits by computer coding specialists.

== See also ==
- Voting machine
- DRE voting machine
- Optical scan voting system
