= Optical reader =

Device that turns visual into digital data

An optical reader is a device that observes visual information and translates it into digital information, as found within most image and barcode and matrix-code scanners.

An example of optical readers are marksense systems for elections where voters mark their choice by filling a rectangle, circle, or oval, or by completing an arrow. After the voting a tabulating device reads the votes using "dark mark logic", whereby the computer selects the darkest mark within a given set as the intended choice or vote.

== See also ==
- Digital paper
- Optical character recognition
- Optical scan voting system
- Optical mark recognition
