= Census of Ireland =

Census held in the Republic of Ireland

The Census of Ireland is typically held on a quinquennial basis by the Central Statistics Office to determine the population of the Republic of Ireland. The most recent census was held in 2022. As of November 2022, the next census is planned to occur in 2027. Prior to the establishment of the Irish Free State in 1922, censuses covered the entire island of Ireland as part of the United Kingdom. The last all-Ireland census was the 1911 census of Ireland, no census having taken place in 1921 due to the Irish War of Independence.

== Dates of census while part of the United Kingdom ==
- May 1813 (failed due to lack of returns and organisation)
- 1821 (failed due to lack of returns and organisation)
- 1831
- Sunday, 6 June 1841
- 1851
- 1861
- 1871
- 1881
- Sunday, 5 April 1891
- Sunday, 31 March 1901
- Sunday, 2 April 1911
- Sunday, 24 April 1921 (not taken due to Irish War of Independence)

== Dates of census post-independence ==
All censuses were held on Sundays.

- 18 April 1926
- 26 April 1936
- 12 May 1946
- 8 April 1951
- 8 April 1956
- 9 April 1961
- 17 April 1966
- 18 April 1971
- 1 April 1979 (Note: The census was planned for 1976, but was cancelled as a Government economy measure. The 1979 census had a restricted number of questions)
- 5 April 1981
- 13 April 1986
- 21 April 1991
- 28 April 1996
- 28 April 2002 (Note: Originally planned for April 2001, the census was delayed to 2002 due to the 2001 foot-and-mouth outbreak which affected Northern Ireland)
- 23 April 2006
- 10 April 2011
- 24 April 2016
- 3 April 2022 (Note: Originally planned for April 2021, the census was delayed to 2022 as part of the government's response to the COVID-19 pandemic in Ireland)
- 9 May 2027

== Political geography ==
Under Article 16 of the Constitution of Ireland, revisions of Dáil constituencies by the Oireachtas are required at a minimum every 12 years. However, they must also have due regard to changes in the population. Under the Electoral Reform Act 2022, the Electoral Commission is required to conduct a review of constituency boundaries after every census. From 1997 up to the establishment of the Electoral Commission in 2023, this function was carried out by a Constituency Commission created for this function.

== Urban geography ==
From 1971 to 2006, census towns were "defined as a cluster of 50 or more occupied dwellings where, within a radius of 800 metres, there was a nucleus of 30 occupied dwellings". From 2016, a new census settlement was defined "as a minimum of 50 occupied dwellings, with a maximum distance between any dwelling and the building closest to it of 100 metres, accompanied by evidence of an urban centre". For the 2022 census, the CSO developed a new urban geography term the Built Up Area (BUA) to define urban areas.

== Surviving Census ==
Due to the explosion in the Public Record Office in Dublin during the Irish Civil War in 1922, the 1813–1851 censuses were destroyed except for a few enumerators books and transcribed records (which were recovered from the wreckage and donated). Furthermore, all censuses from 1861-1891 were deliberately destroyed, the 1861–1871 were destroyed for the protection of privacy. Furthermore, in 1918, due to a paper shortage, the 1881–1891 were pulped, against the request of the staff at the Public Record Office in Dublin.

There is an active attempt at recovering the 1813–1851 censuses and re-constructing them with the Virtual Record Treasury of Ireland. In July 2025, "over 200,000 names" were released by the Virtual Record Treasury in their new Knowledge Graph.

The 1901 and the 1911 Censuses were released in the 1961 by order of the Minister of Justice, Oscar Traynor to compensate the loss of earlier records. The data of the 1926 Irish Free State Census was released online on 18 April 2026, the centenary of the census. Later Censuses are not currently public due to Section 35 of the 1993 Statistics Act which bans the release of census return forms until 100 years after the enumeration date.
