= Dáil constituencies =

Constituencies used in elections to Dáil Éireann

- Category: Electoral district
- Location: Ireland
- Number: 43 (as of 2024)
- Government: Dáil Éireann

There are 43 multi-member electoral districts, known as Dáil constituencies, to elect 174 TDs to Dáil Éireann, the house of representatives of the Oireachtas, Ireland's parliament, on the system of proportional representation by means of the single transferable vote (PR-STV), to a maximum term of five years. The configuration of constituencies was amended by the Electoral (Amendment) Act 2023, which were in operation for the 2024 general election.

== Electoral law ==
Article 16.2 of the Constitution of Ireland outlines the requirements for constituencies. The total number of TDs is to be no more than one TD representing twenty thousand and no less than one TD representing thirty thousand of the population, and the ratio should be the same in each constituency, as far as practicable, avoiding malapportionment. Under the Constitution, constituencies are to be revised at least once every twelve years in accordance with the census reports, which are compiled by the Central Statistics Office every five years.

Under the Electoral Reform Act 2022, the Electoral Commission conducted a review of all constituencies on the publication, by the Central Statistics Office, of the preliminary result of the census. The commission is independent and is responsible for the redrawing of constituency boundaries. Any alterations to constituencies do not take effect during the life of the Dáil sitting when a revision is made. Prior to the establishment of the Commission in 2023, constituency reviews were carried out by a Constituency Commission under the Electoral Act 1997, as amended.

The constitution specifies that the minimum number of TDs returned for each constituency is three, but does not define the maximum number; however, electoral law specifies a maximum number of five TDs. The electoral system for general elections is proportional representation by means of a single transferable vote (PR-STV). PR-STV is also used at European Parliament elections and local elections. Although they are conducted under the same rules, in the case of by-elections (where this is only one vacancy) and presidential elections, this becomes alternative vote.

== Current constituencies ==
On its establishment in February 2023, the Electoral Commission sought submissions for a review of Dáil constituencies and European Parliament constituencies following the publication of the 2022 census preliminary results. These changes were provided by the Electoral (Amendment) Act 2023, which took effect on the dissolution of the 33rd Dáil on 8 November 2024 and were in use at the 2024 general election on 29 November 2024. The 34th Dáil has 174 TDs, an increase from the membership of 160 TDs in the 33rd Dáil. The number of constituencies increased from 39 to 43.

Constituency	Seats
Carlow–Kilkenny	5
Cavan–Monaghan	5
Clare	4
Cork East	4
Cork North-Central	5
Cork North-West	3
Cork South-Central	5
Cork South-West	3
Donegal	5
Dublin Bay North	5
Dublin Bay South	4
Dublin Central	4
Dublin Fingal East	3
Dublin Fingal West	3
Dublin Mid-West	5
Dublin North-West	3
Dublin Rathdown	4
Dublin South-Central	4
Dublin South-West	5
Dublin West	5
Dún Laoghaire	4
Galway East	4
Galway West	5
Kerry	5
Kildare North	5
Kildare South	4
Laois	3
Limerick City	4
Limerick County	3
Longford–Westmeath	5
Louth	5
Mayo	5
Meath East	4
Meath West	3
Offaly	3
Roscommon–Galway	3
Sligo–Leitrim	4
Tipperary North	3
Tipperary South	3
Waterford	4
Wexford	4
Wicklow	4
Wicklow–Wexford	3

== See also ==
- Historic Dáil constituencies
