= Offaly (Dáil constituency) =

Dáil constituency (2016–2020, 2024–present)

- Dáil constituency
- Location of Offaly within Ireland
- Interactive map of constituency boundaries since the 2024 general election
- Major settlements: Clara; Birr; Edenderry; Tullamore

Current constituency
- Created: 2024
- Seats: 3
- TDs: John Clendennen (FG); Tony McCormack (FF); Carol Nolan (Ind)
- Local government area: County Offaly
- Created from: Laois–Offaly

Offaly
- Former Dáil constituency

Former constituency
- Created: 2016
- Abolished: 2020
- Seats: 3
- Local government areas: County Offaly; County Tipperary
- Created from: Laois–Offaly
- Replaced by: Kildare South; Laois–Offaly; Tipperary

Offaly is a parliamentary constituency represented in Dáil Éireann, the lower house of the Irish parliament or Oireachtas. The constituency elects three deputies (Teachtaí Dála, commonly known as TDs) on the system of proportional representation by means of the single transferable vote (PR-STV).

== History and boundaries ==
The Constituency Commission proposed in its 2012 report that at the next general election a new constituency called Offaly be created. The report proposed changes to the constituencies of Ireland so as to reduce the total number of TDs from 166 to 158.

It was established by the Electoral (Amendment) (Dáil Constituencies) Act 2013. The constituency incorporated all of County Offaly from the previous Laois–Offaly constituency, and additionally twenty-four electoral divisions from Tipperary North.

It was abolished at the 2020 general election, along with the Laois constituency. They were replaced by a re-created Laois–Offaly constituency, with the transfer of the electoral division of Portarlington North to Kildare South.

In 2023, the Electoral Commission recommended the establishment of a three-seat constituency of Offaly, comprising the entire county of Offaly.

For the 2024 general election, the Electoral (Amendment) Act 2023 defines the constituency as:

"The county of Offaly."

== TDs ==
Teachtaí Dála (TDs) for Offaly 2016–2020
Key to parties: FF = Fianna Fáil; FG = Fine Gael; SF = Sinn Féin
Dáil	Election	Deputy (Party)	Deputy (Party)	Deputy (Party)
32nd	2016	Carol Nolan (SF)	Barry Cowen (FF)	Marcella Corcoran Kennedy (FG)
33rd	2020	Constituency abolished. See Laois–Offaly and Tipperary.		
34th	2024	Carol Nolan (Ind)	Tony McCormack (FF)	John Clendennen (FG)

Note: The columns in this table are used only for presentational purposes, and no significance should be attached to the order of columns. For details of the order in which seats were won at each election, see the detailed results of that election.

== Elections ==
*: Outgoing TD

=== 2024 general election ===
2024 general election: Offaly
Party	Candidate	FPv%	Count						
Party	Candidate	FPv%	1	2	3	4	5	6	7
Independent	Carol Nolan	22.2	8,282	8,383	8,750	9,147	9,594		
Fine Gael	John Clendennen	17.6	6,580	6,599	6,955	7,099	7,620	8,550	8,617
Fianna Fáil	Tony McCormack	17.0	6,349	6,358	6,567	6,619	7,929	9,039	9,151
Sinn Féin	Aoife Masterson	16.6	6,211	6,264	6,857	7,235	7,536	8,433	8,501
Independent	Eddie Fitzpatrick	7.9	2,961	2,982	3,150	3,550	4,113		
Fianna Fáil	Claire Murray	6.9	2,564	2,576	2,758	3,422			
Independent Ireland	Fergus McDonnell	5.5	2,074	2,116	2,194				
Green	Pippa Hackett	2.5	925	934					
PBP–Solidarity	Keishia Taylor (Note: Taylor is a member of Solidarity.)	1.5	576	590					
Independent	Mike Boylan	1.5	546	560					
Aontú	Maureen Ward	0.8	317						
Electorate: 62,931 Valid: 37,385 Spoilt: 249 Quota: 9,347 Turnout: 59.8%

=== 2016 general election ===
2016 general election: Offaly
Party	Candidate	FPv%	Count						
Party	Candidate	FPv%	1	2	3	4	5	6	7
Fianna Fáil	Barry Cowen	28.1	12,366						
Fine Gael	Marcella Corcoran Kennedy	15.5	6,838	6,919	7,270	7,798	9,484	11,313	
Independent	Joe Hannigan	11.8	5,188	5,226	5,536	5,816			
Sinn Féin	Carol Nolan	10.9	4,804	4,882	5,459	6,295	7,195	8,785	8,890
Renua	John Leahy	10.4	4,596	4,759	5,319	5,833	6,588		
Independent	John Foley	9.5	4,200	4,241	4,536				
Fianna Fáil	Eddie Fitzpatrick	7.7	3,394	4,297	4,578	6,147	7,141	8,521	8,720
Irish Democratic	Ken Smollen	2.2	971	999					
Independent	Teresa Ryan Feehan	1.4	603	616					
Independent	Kate Bopp	1.2	549	554					
Green	Christopher Fettes	1.2	525	532					
Electorate: 65,636 Valid: 44,034 Spoilt: 411 Quota: 11,009 Turnout: 67.7%

== See also ==
- Dáil constituencies
- Politics of the Republic of Ireland
- Historic Dáil constituencies
- Elections in the Republic of Ireland
