= 1926 Irish Free State census =

First census after the partition of Ireland

1926 census of Ireland
- 2 April 1911
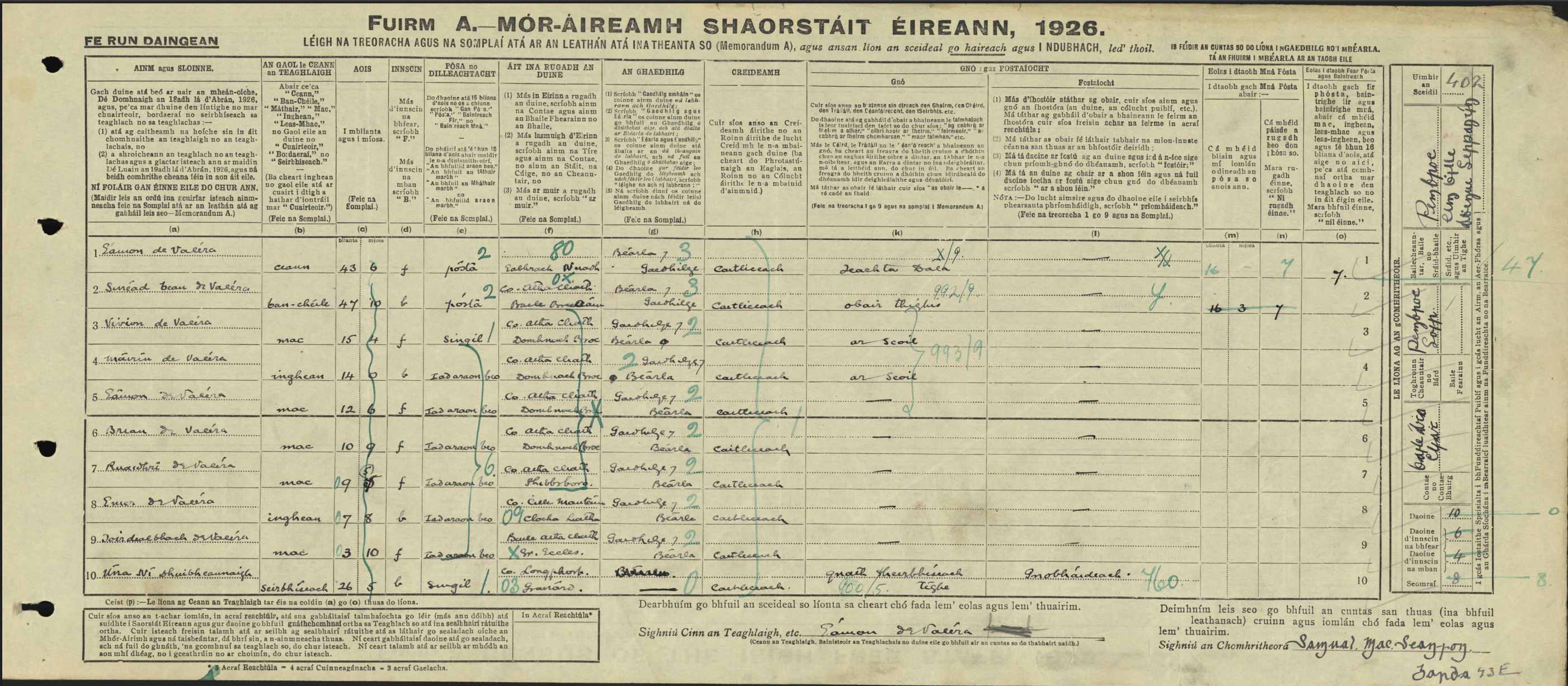
- 1926 census form of Éamon de Valera (Note: Completed in Irish, with surname spelt "de Valéra".) and family

General information
- Country: Irish Free State

Results
- Total population: 2,971,992 (▼ -5.34%)
- Most populous county: Dublin (505,654)
- Least populous county: Longford (39,847)

A census of the Irish Free State was held on 18 April 1926. A parallel census for Northern Ireland was held the same day. These were the first Irish censuses since the partition of Ireland of 1920–1925. The previous all-island census had been in 1911; the decennial census due in 1921 was cancelled because the revolutionary Irish Republic had urged a boycott of it as being a project of the Dublin Castle administration it was fighting in the Irish War of Independence. The 1926 Free State data was made freely accessible online on 18 April 2026, the centenary of the census.

== Organisation ==
The General Register Office (GRO) had organised earlier Irish censuses. After the Free State was established in December 1922, several advisory committees of civil servants and academics from 1923 to 1925 advised the Cumann na nGaedheal government on what statistics the new state needed and how they should be gathered. The plan agreed by 1925 was for the GRO to organise the following year's census of population under an amended version of previous statutes, with a separate census of production to be organised by the Statistics Branch of the new Department of Industry and Commerce under a new statute. Delay in preparation meant that a single generic statute, the Statistics Act 1926, was passed by the Free State Oireachtas to empower the Statistics Branch to organise both censuses, with the census of production delayed to 1927. The population census was actioned by a ministerial order made under the 1926 act by Patrick McGilligan, the Minister for Industry and Commerce. The Statistics Branch consulted the GRO for its institutional memory of previous censuses. In December 1925 the Craigavon ministry had chosen 18 April 1926 for the census in Northern Ireland, so the Free State government chose the same date.

There were two primary forms: Form A, for each household, to be completed by the "head of household"; and Form B, for aggregating all the households and unoccupied houses in an enumeration area, to be completed by the enumerator. Enumerators were members of the Garda Síochána, who distributed Form A's in the week preceding Census Day and collected them in the following days. The enumeration area was the townland in rural areas and street in urban areas. The questions to be asked on the forms were decided in consultation with the advisory committee on statistics.

Form A questions relating to individuals:

- retained from earlier censuses: name and surname; (Note: The 1911 census specified that only initials be recorded for inmates of "every prison, workhouse, barrack, hospital, or lunatic asylum, and ... every public or charitable institution". The 1926 census followed this practice as regards prisons and mental hospitals but not military barracks, including the Treaty Ports.) relation to head of household (spouse, stepson, servant, lodger, visitor, etc); sex; marital status; religion; occupation; and number of children of current and of any previous marriage.
- asked in greater detail: age in months as well as years; knowledge of Irish (as native or second language, spoken or written); birthplace (town or townland rather than merely county).
- new: employees were asked name and business of the employer; under-16s were asked which parents were still living.
- dropped in 1926: illiteracy (which was felt to have become confined to the elderly); disability (blindness, deafness, mutism and learning disability; previous censuses had significant underreporting).

Besides details of individuals, Form A also requested the size in statute acres of any agricultural holdings associated with the household. Form B included details of all buildings in the area—classed as multi-household, single-household, unoccupied residential, and non-residential—with for each household the number of males, females, and rooms occupied.

Publicity to encourage co-operation was solicited from Catholic and Protestant clergy, chambers of commerce, trade unions and professional associations, and national school teachers. Instructions on completing the form were broadcast on 2RN on 17 April and 18 April. Sinn Féin told its supporters to complete the census form, an exception to its usual advocacy of noncooperation with the institutions of the Free State, whose legitimacy it denied.

For the first time, the census forms were printed in Irish as well as English (on opposite sides of the same sheet). Less than 1% of respondents filled in the Irish-language side.

== Statistics ==
Each enumerator completed a separate Form C summarising all data from the Forms A and B they had gathered. A preliminary report was published in August 1926 by tabulating the Form C returns. The total recorded population was 2,971,992; down from the 3,139,688 recorded for the equivalent area in the 1911 census.

The Form A and B data was transcribed to punched cards by 21 "girls" and input into tabulating machines by "12 male clerks assisted by 12 junior male clerks". Detailed results generated from this were reported in nine thematic volumes published between 1928 and 1933 and a tenth volume in 1934 analysing the data of the previous nine. Maps were produced in co-operation with the Ordnance Survey of Ireland. Whereas censuses up to 1911 had reported rural data down to the townland level, to save expense the published 1926 census reports stopped at the level of the district electoral division (DED), which comprises multiple townlands. The larger reporting units built from DEDs were dispensary districts; urban and rural districts; administrative counties and county boroughs; and provinces. Although DEDs and (except in County Dublin) rural districts had ceased to be units with administrative functions, they were retained as convenient areas for aggregation of data and comparison with previous censuses. Basic population information was also provided for Dáil constituencies.

=== Religion ===
Compared with 1911, there was a small overall decline in the number of Catholics, with increases in some urban areas. The number of non-Catholics declined steeply, especially in western and southern areas, and places which formerly had British Army bases, such as the Curragh Camp in County Kildare. Thus, Catholics increased as a percentage of the overall population, from 89.6% to 92.6%.

Numbers professing various religions at 1926 census, with percentage change (Δ) of each since 1911, and total non-Catholic percentage (%) (Legend)
Area	Total		Catholic		Other denominations and religions												
Area	Total		Catholic		Total			Anglican (Note: Called "Protestant Episcopalian" in the Report; mainly Church of Ireland, some Church of England)		Presbyterian		Methodist		Jewish/Baptist/other			
Area		Δ		Δ		%	Δ		Δ		Δ		Δ	J	B	O	Δ
Free State total	2,971,992	−5.3	2,751,269	−2.2	220,723	7.4	−32.5	164,215	−34.2	32,429	−28.7	10,663	−35.1	3,686	717	9,013	−14.6
Leinster total	1,149,092	−1.1	1,032,835	+4.3	116,257	10.1	−32.4	92,899	−33.7	8,589	−33.2	5,564	−31.0	3,226	499	5,480	−15.4
Carlow	34,476	−4.9	31,487	−2.6	2,989	8.7	−24.0	2,719	−24.5	97	−20.5	106	−32.5	15	0	52	+19.6
Dublin Co. Bor.	316,693	+3.9	285,033	+12.5	31,660	10.0	−38.4	23,417	−40.5	2,658	−37.0	1,431	−38.4	2,450	170	1,534	−25.0
Dublin Co.	188,961	+9.6	149,026	+21.8	39,935	21.1	−20.2	30,392	−22.7	3,641	−17.3	2,379	−12.2	700	247	2,576	−1.9
Kildare	58,028	−12.9	54,401	−0.5	3,627	6.3	−69.6	3,193	−69.6	223	−63.5	118	−79.5	12	19	62	−64.0
Kilkenny	70,990	−5.3	68,377	−4.0	2,613	3.7	−30.7	2,342	−30.2	108	−49.5	61	−15.3	5	0	97	−19.0
Laois (Note: Named Queen's County in 1911)	51,540	−5.7	46,880	−3.3	4,660	9.0	−24.2	4,193	−21.0	143	−49.3	214	−42.0	3	6	101	−42.4
Longford	39,847	−9.1	37,555	−6.8	2,292	5.8	−34.9	1,973	−36.0	121	−47.4	109	−33.1	0	0	89	+81.6
Louth	62,739	−1.5	59,623	+2.3	3,116	5.0	−41.9	2,295	−43.2	555	−40.6	147	−36.6	19	10	90	−22.2
Meath	62,969	−3.3	59,769	−1.5	3,200	5.1	−27.8	2,884	−26.9	181	−48.3	17	−69.1	4	1	113	+45.7
Offaly (Note: Named King's County in 1911)	52,592	−7.5	48,705	−4.8	3,887	7.4	−31.3	3,409	−30.5	148	−58.1	205	−24.1	3	3	119	0
Westmeath	56,818	−5.3	54,208	−1.0	2,610	4.6	−49.9	2,301	−49.4	149	−56.4	69	−66.0	2	18	71	−18.8
Wexford	95,848	−6.3	90,136	−4.5	5,712	6.0	−27.3	5,119	−27.4	149	−41.3	216	−35.3	0	11	217	+2.7
Wicklow	57,591	−5.1	47,635	−0.8	9,956	17.3	−21.7	8,662	−22.4	416	−25.3	492	−18.8	13	14	359	+0.5
Munster total	969,902	−6.3	934,703	−4.0	35,199	3.6	−42.9	28,614	−43.5	1,601	−61.7	2,397	−42.6	439	186	1,962	−3.8
Clare	95,064	−8.8	93,942	−8.2	1,122	1.2	−41.9	833	−51.3	54	−67.5	6	−84.2	7	1	221	+110.5
Cork Co. Bor.	78,490	+2.4	74,047	+9.2	4,443	5.7	−49.8	3,102	−52.8	350	−61.6	394	−38.7	290	58	249	−18.0
Cork Co.	287,257	−8.9	271,072	−6.0	16,185	5.6	−40.0	13,791	−40.0	468	−54.9	1,221	−40.4	72	38	595	−21.6
Kerry	149,171	−6.6	146,821	−5.5	2,350	1.6	−46.2	2,051	−44.9	104	−60.8	100	−62.3	3	9	83	−16.7
Limerick Co. Bor.	39,448	+2.4	37,640	+8.0	1,808	4.6	−50.5	1,285	−44.5	147	−82.6	104	−51.2	30	38	204	−1.8
Limerick Co.	100,895	−3.5	98,793	−2.7	2,102	2.1	−31.1	1,691	−33.7	65	−52.2	206	−24.5	3	10	127	+55.6
Tipperary, North R.	59,645	−5.1	57,061	−3.7	2,584	4.3	−28.9	2,188	−31.4	39	−61.8	185	−23.2	0	0	172	+65.4
Tipperary, South R.	81,370	−9.1	79,503	−6.4	1,867	2.3	−59.8	1,559	−61.3	134	−59.4	38	−80.4	7	1	128	+60.0
Waterford Co. Bor.	26,647	−3.0	25,466	+0.5	1,181	4.4	−44.6	861	−43.7	124	−32.2	70	−49.6	27	20	79	−55.2
Waterford Co.	51,915	−8.1	50,358	−6.8	1,557	3.0	−36.2	1,253	−38.2	116	−42.3	73	−40.2	0	11	104	+25.0
Connacht total	552,907	−9.5	538,277	−8.5	14,630	2.6	−36.3	12,417	−34.7	976	−52.8	738	−44.2	11	12	476	−13.7
Galway	169,366	−7.1	167,347	−5.9	2,019	1.2	−53.1	1,673	−52.8	201	−59.4	64	−57.9	0	1	80	−28.3
Leitrim	55,907	−12.1	52,196	−10.3	3,711	6.6	−31.6	3,286	−30.0	89	−52.2	279	−45.3	1	2	54	+72.7
Mayo	172,690	−10.1	170,211	−9.5	2,479	1.4	−39.7	2,066	−38.9	271	−47.4	66	−53.2	3	0	73	+5.6
Roscommon	83,556	−11.1	82,210	−10.4	1,346	1.6	−39.5	1,147	−39.2	110	−43.6	18	−71.9	0	7	64	−10.1
Sligo	71,388	−9.7	66,313	−8.1	5,075	7.1	−26.7	4,245	−22.9	305	−55.0	311	−31.8	7	2	205	−23.8
Ulster (excl NI)	300,091	−9.4	245,454	−5.8	54,637	18.2	−22.5	30,285	−23.7	21,263	−19.4	1,964	−31.7	10	20	1,095	−28.3
Cavan	82,452	−9.6	69,383	−6.6	13,069	15.9	−22.7	10,102	−22.0	2,196	−22.8	468	−40.1	6	2	295	−7.1
Donegal	152,508	−9.5	124,941	−6.1	27,567	18.1	−22.4	13,774	−23.6	12,162	−19.0	1,202	−29.2	1	15	413	−45.1
Monaghan	65,131	−8.9	51,130	−4.2	14,001	21.5	−22.6	6,409	−26.5	6,905	−18.9	294	−25.6	3	3	387	−14.6

=== Occupations ===
Summary occupation statistics of the 1926 Irish Free State census (Legend)
Code	Occupation	Total	Male	Female
I.	Agricultural occupations	672,129	550,172	121,957
I. A.	Farmers and relatives assisting	533,025	412,763	120,262
I. B.	Other agricultural occupations	139,104	137,409	1,695
II.	Fishermen	5,753	5,736	17
III.	Mining and quarrying occupations	2,599	2,590	9
IV.	Other producers, makers and repairers	186,617	154,016	32,601
IV. A.	Makers of foods, drinks and tobacco	22,993	18,038	4,955
IV. A. 1.	Makers of foods	16,362	12,541	3,821
IV. A. 2.	Makers of drinks	5,228	5,079	149
IV. A. 3.	Makers of tobacco	1,403	418	985
IV. B.	Textile workers	7,629	2,942	4,687
IV. C.	Makers of apparel and textile goods	32,990	14,315	18,675
IV. D.	Workers in hides and skins and makers of leather goods (not boots and shoes)	2,081	1,965	116
IV. E.	Workers in wood and furniture	24,389	23,710	679
IV. F.	Metal workers	27,696	27,313	383
IV. G.	Electrical apparatus fitters and makers	3,117	3,084	33
IV. H.	Workers in chemical processes, makers of fertilizers, soap, etc.	1,676	1,450	226
IV. I.	Workers in, and makers of, paper and cardboard, printers, bookbinders, etc.	6,084	3,850	2,234
IV. J.	Builders, bricklayers, stone and slate workers and contractors	47,671	47,557	114
IV. K.	Painters and decorators	5,333	5,298	35
IV. L.	Other producers, makers and repairers	4,958	4,494	464
I–IV.	Total producers, makers and repairers	867,098	712,514	154,584
V.	Workers in transport and communication	64,952	63,686	1,266
V. A.	Railway workers	9,153	8,971	182
V. B.	Road transport workers	25,241	25,116	125
V. C.	Water transport workers	11,580	11,514	66
V. D.	Other transport workers	18,978	18,085	893
VI.	Commercial, finance and insurance occupations	85,008	56,520	28,488
VII	Persons in public administration and defence (excluding professional men and typists)	37,333	33,348	3,985
VIII.	Professional occupations (excluding clerks)	55,441	25,936	29,505
IX.	Persons in personal service (including hotels, etc.)	127,842	18,381	109,461
IX. А.	Domestic servants	90,198	2,645	87,553
IX. В.	Other personal service	37,644	15,736	21,908
X.	Clerks (not civil servants or local authority) and all typists	30,007	17,206	12,801
XI.	Other gainful occupations	39,981	36,177	3,804
XI. A.	Persons employed in entertainments and sport	4,325	3,448	877
XI. B.	Warehousemen and assistants	6,935	4,592	2,343
XI. C.	Stationary engine drivers	2,231	2,231	0
XI. D.	Others	26,490	25,906	584
I–XI.	Total occupied persons, 12 years and over	1,307,662	963,768	343,894
XII.	Unoccupied persons 12 years and over	976,195	193,012	783,183
I–XII.	Total persons 12 years and over	2,283,857	1,156,780	1,127,077
	Total persons under 12 years of age	688,135	350,109	338,026
	Total population	2,971,992	1,506,889	1,465,103

== 2026 publication ==
After the Statistics Branch had finished processing the census forms, they were put in the custody of the Public Record Office of Ireland (PROI), which also stored the forms from the 1901 and 1911 censuses. Under the 1926 act, records from the 1926 and subsequent censuses were permanently sealed and only accessible to personnel of the Statistics Branch and from 1949 its successor, the Central Statistics Office (CSO). By contrast, the 1901 and 1911 forms were unsealed in 1961 under older legislation, and subsequently photographed and microfilmed by the Genealogical Society of Utah (GSU). In 1988 the PROI became part of the National Archives of Ireland (NAI). The Statistics Act 1993 repealed and replaced the Statistics Act 1926 and established 100 years as the time limit for which census forms remain legally sealed.

In the late 2000s, the government began preparing a "Decade of Centenaries" commemorating events from 1912 to 1923 during the Irish revolutionary period. One element of the programme was genealogy tourism, with The Gathering Ireland 2013 as a highlight. In 2011 the NAI completed a project (largely outsourced to Library and Archives Canada) of digitisation of the 1901 and 1911 forms from the GSU microfilm. These data were made freely accessible on the NAI website. Irish genealogists suggested amending the 1993 act to allow the 1926 census records to be published early as part of this effort. Labhrás Ó Murchú introduced a private member's bill to that effect in Seanad Éireann, which lapsed at the 2011 general election. The election led to a coalition government whose programme promised to "enable publication of the 1926 census to stimulate genealogy tourism". Ó Murchú's reintroduced bill reached second stage in 2013, whereupon the government voted it down saying there were difficulties both technical (there was no microfilm version to expedite scanning of forms) and legal (right to privacy laws would necessitate redaction of the 1926 census details of those elderly persons still living at the time of publication).

In November 2022 the Fianna Fáil–Fine Gael–Green government provided the NAI with €5M to begin digitisation of the 1926 forms in time for online publication on 18 April 2026, the centenary date. Since the project started before the 100-year limit, NAI personnel had to be accredited to the CSO to comply with the 1993 act. High- resolution colour scans were made of about 734,000 forms bound into 2,496 volumes, one per DED. Of these, 70,708 forms needed repair before scanning. Historians and genealogists granted preview access to the data were likewise accredited to the CSO and made to promise to delay publication of their findings until the centenary date.

The online publication data is structured and browsable by geographical area down to the levels of enumeration area and individual household. The original forms are viewable in image format. The initial release provides text format for name, address, sex, age, and religion, as both input and output of searches. Future phases are planned to provide text formatting of other fields.

People recorded in the census and still living on publication date (all necessarily centenarians) are entitled by the GDPR (General Data Protection Regulation) to have their personal details removed. About 1,200 relevant people known to the Department of Social Protection were contacted individually to provide or refuse permission; others can request removal by contacting the NAI. Forty-eight centenarians agreed not only to have their data published but also to act as "ambassadors" publicising the census website; 9 of the 48 are nuns.

Besides being of interest to genealogists and members of the Irish diaspora, the data has been anticipated by historians as a primary source for the demographic changes of the revolutionary period, especially by comparing individual records with those published previously from the 1911 census. This may help shed light on the controversial question of the causes of the relative decline in the Protestant population of the Free State over the period; however, the loss of the records from the 1926 Northern Ireland census militates against this.

== Sources ==
- Linehan, T. P. (1997–1998). "The development of official Irish statistics". Journal of the Statistical and Social Inquiry Society of Ireland. XXVII (V). Dublin: 47–98.
- Lyon, Stanley (October 1934). General Reports (PDF). Census of Population, 1926. Vol. X. Dublin: Stationery Office. P. No. 1242.
- McGilligan, Patrick (22 March 1926). "S. R. & O. No. 76/1926 — The Statistics (Census of Population) Order, 1926". electronic Irish Statute Book.

== Footnotes ==
Legend for tables: Aggregate of the succeeding subcodes Aggregate of all preceding codes Population increased rather than decreased
