= Electronic voting in the Republic of Ireland =

Electronic voting machines for elections in Ireland were used on a trial basis in 2002, but plans to extend it to all polling stations were put on hold in 2004 after public opposition and political controversy. Electoral law was amended in 2001 and 2004 and sufficient voting machines for the entire state were purchased, but the plan was officially dropped in 2009 and the machines were subsequently scrapped. Elections continue to use paper ballots completed in pencil.

== Background ==
At the 17 May 2002 general election, electronic voting machines were used in three of 42 constituencies (Dublin North, Dublin West and Meath) on a trial basis, with the intention that it would be extended to the whole country for future elections. For the 19 October 2002 referendum on the Treaty of Nice, machines were used in seven constituencies (the previous three plus Dublin Mid-West, Dublin South, Dublin South-West and Dún Laoghaire) covering 18% of the electorate.

A confidential report in 2002 expressed serious concern over the security of the voting machines. According to the report, the integrity of the ballot could not be guaranteed with the equipment and controls used. The Department of the Environment disagreed with many of these findings, saying the machines were secure and that the presence of voting officials prevents tampering. Socialist Party TD Joe Higgins said electronic voting should be abandoned, and he claimed, a lack of transparency and the new system could be open to "radical manipulation."

== Proposed implementation ==
Following the 2002 trial of the machines, in 2004 the government undertook plans to introduce a nationwide electronic voting system for the local and European Parliament elections. The proposed change was under the supervision of then Minister for the Environment, Heritage and Local Government Martin Cullen.

In March 2004 the Government of Ireland established the Independent Commission on Electronic Voting and Counting at Elections to examine the proposed system. It was dissolved in 2006. The Commission issued a series of reports reviewing the proposed system and comparing it to the existing electoral system:

"The Commission can recommend the voting and counting equipment as follows:

- The voting machine and related hardware components are of good quality and their design, which is based on voting systems that have been reliable in use elsewhere for some years, has also remained stable since their adaptation for use in Ireland. Subject to some minor security and usability enhancements, followed by extended and rigorous testing once they have been so modified, the voting machine and related components can be confidently recommended for use.
- The embedded software of the voting machine is also of adequate quality, requiring only minor modifications followed by further analysis to confirm its reliability."

== Scrapping of project ==
The prime issue was the lack of verifiability by the absence of an audit mechanism or verified paper trail. The former Taoiseach Bertie Ahern had defended the flawed system in the Dáil, bemoaning the use of "stupid old pencils".

The voting machines bought by the government from Dutch firm Nedap were kept in storage as the cabinet pondered what to do after the Commission on Electronic Voting said it could not recommend the system. Approximately €0.5m was spent improving the software. Ahern defended the system despite public scepticism and opposition from within his own party on the basis that having spent the money, it would cause loss of national pride if the system were scrapped.

In October 2006, a group of Dutch hackers, including Rop Gonggrijp, showed how similar machines to the ones purchased in Ireland could be modified by replacing the EEPROMs with Nedap -Firmware with EEPROMs with their own firmware.

On 23 April 2009, Minister for the Environment John Gormley announced that the electronic voting system was to be scrapped, due to cost and the public's dissatisfaction with it.

A Department of the Environment website demonstrating how to use electronic voting machines was live until 2012.

On 6 October 2010, the Taoiseach Brian Cowen said that the 7,000 machines would not be used for voting and would be disposed of. By that date, the total cost of the electronic voting project has reached €54.6 million, including €3 million spent on storing the machines over the previous five years.

In 2012, KMK Metals Recycling paid €70,267 for 7,500 e-voting machines; 1,232 transport/storage trolleys; 2,142 hand trolleys and 4,787 metal tilt tables.

== Later discussions ==
In 2018, John Paul Phelan, the Minister for Housing, Planning, and Local Government responded to a Dáil question from Shane Cassells about online voting. Phelan said there were "no proposals to introduce measures to support online voting or to re-introduce e-voting"; he had an "open mind" on online voting, but there were other electoral changes which would take priority, including online access to the electoral register and the introduction of an Electoral Commission.

Later in 2018, Minister of State for Local Government and Electoral Reform John Paul Phelan told reporters that there is no question of the pencil and the ballot paper being removed from the Irish election process.
