= Electoral Commission (Ireland) =

Statutory body overseeing the conduct of elections and constituencies in Ireland

- An Coimisiún Toghcháin

Agency overview
- Formed: 9 February 2023
- Preceding agencies: Constituency Commission; Referendum Commission; Local Electoral Area Boundary Committee
- Jurisdiction: Ireland
- Headquarters: Dublin Castle
- Agency executives: Marie Baker, Chairperson; Art O'Leary, Chief Executive Officer
- Key document: Electoral Reform Act 2022
- Website: Official website

The Electoral Commission (An Coimisiún Toghcháin) is an election commission with responsibility for the oversight of all elections in Ireland, including electoral operations, constituency reviews and electoral integrity. It was established in 2023. Prior to its establishment, some of these functions had been carried out by various government departments, local government officials, statutory agencies and components of the Oireachtas and in the case of Boundaries by a judge led commission, while other functions are novel to the new Commission.

A proposal for an electoral commission was first considered in a government report commissioned in 2008, and was developed by a series of governments since then, before the publication of the heads of a bill in 2021.

== Organisation ==
The Electoral Commission was established on 9 February 2023 under the Electoral Reform Act 2022 by order of the Minister for Housing, Local Government and Heritage, Darragh O'Brien.

In March 2021 it was announced that Art O'Leary, upon completion in June 2021 of his seven-year term as Secretary General to the President, would be appointed to work on the preparatory institutional and administrative arrangements for the commission, pending its formal establishment.

The 2023 budget earmarks €5.7m for the commission and a further €2.77m to enable local authorities to modernise the electoral register.

== Membership ==
The Commission may consist of between 7 and 9 members: a chair appointed from the judiciary, two ex officio members, and four to six ordinary members.

Members of the Electoral Commission
Name	Role	Notes
Marie Baker	Chairperson	Judge of the Supreme Court
Ger Deering	Ex-officio member	Ombudsman
Peter Finnegan	Ex-officio member	Clerk of Dáil Éireann
John Curran	Ordinary member	Former Minister of State (4 year term)
Maura Quinn	Ordinary member	4 year term
Ross Frenett	Ordinary member	CEO of Moonshot
Lee Komito	Ordinary member	4 year term.

== Functions ==
The functions of the commission are defined by the Electoral Reform Act 2022.

=== Electoral operations ===
- Referendum campaigns
- Constituency and electoral boundary reviews
- Registration of political parties — the commission CEO is ex officio Registrar of Political Parties
- Oversight of the electoral register

=== Electoral integrity ===
- Regulation of online electoral information (This part of the Electoral Reform Act 2022 (Part 5) has not yet been commenced)
- Regulation of online advertising during election periods (This part of the Electoral Reform Act 2022 (Part 4) has not yet been commenced)
- Post electoral event reviews
- Advice

== Reports ==
- On 30 August 2023, it published a review of Dáil constituency boundaries, in which it recommended an increase in the size of the Dáil from 160 to 174 TDs, to be elected in 43 constituencies. It included the establishment of new constituencies:
  - Dublin Fingal East
  - Dublin Fingal West
  - Wicklow–Wexford

and the re-establishment of historic constituencies:
- Laois
- Offaly
- Tipperary North
- Tipperary South

== Background ==
An electoral commission was recommended by several official reports, including the Second Report (2006) of the Commission on Electronic Voting. Private member's bills to establish an electoral commission were introduced by Ciarán Lynch in 2008 and 2012.

In 2008, the Department of the Environment, Heritage and Local Government commissioned and published a study on introducing an electoral commission, carried out by academics from University College Dublin. After the 2011 general election, the Fine Gael and Labour parties formed a coalition government whose programme included a commitment to establish an electoral commission. Such a commission was also recommended in the Constitutional Convention's 2013 report on the system of elections to Dáil Éireann (lower house of the Oireachtas), which was also endorsed the government. Alan Kelly, the Minister for the Environment, Community and Local Government, outlined progress of the plan in Seanad Éireann in December 2014, The government published a consultation paper in January 2015, and said it intended to introduce a bill in the Oireachtas in 2015. The Oireachtas Joint Committee on Environment, Culture and the Gaeltacht discussed the plan with Alan Kelly on 10 March 2015. Kelly stated that drafting the enabling bill would begin when the committee had consulted and reported back to him, that he expected the bill to be enacted by the end of 2015, that the commission would not be established before the next general election, and that functions should be assigned to it on a phased basis. In April 2015 the committee invited submissions on the government's consultation paper from interest groups, and held hearings with them in June and July. The committee's report was launched on 14 January 2016.

After the 2016 general election, a minority coalition government was formed by Fine Gael and Independent TDs with confidence and supply support from Fianna Fáil. Its programme committed to establishing an electoral commission "independent of Government and directly accountable to the Oireachtas". The government's September 2016 list of planned legislation included the Electoral Commission Bill in the Department of Housing, Planning, Community and Local Government's "medium and long term" plans. In June 2017, the department was preparing a Regulatory Impact Analysis (RIA). In October 2017, Taoiseach Leo Varadkar said there was "no timeframe" for establishing the commission and it was "very much a long-term project". In September 2018 John Paul Phelan, Minister of State for Local Government and Electoral Reform, gave an update to the Seanad. He said a priority was "modernisation" of the electoral register, which different local authorities had been maintaining in divergent manners; this would take "two to three years", involve "significant public consultation", and proceed separately from work on an Electoral Commission. The Electoral Commission RIA published in November 2018 compared four implementation strategies. The ensuing public consultation received 23 submissions by the closing date of 15 March 2019. In July 2019 Phelan said work was commencing on drafting the general scheme (outline) of an Electoral Commission Bill.

=== 2021 draft bill ===
Negotiations after the February 2020 general election led to the formation in June of a Fianna Fáil–Fine Gael–Green coalition, whose programme for government promised an electoral commission by the end of 2021. Malcolm Noonan was appointed as Minister of State at the Department of Housing, Local Government and Heritage with responsibility for heritage and electoral reform.

The Department of Housing, Local Government and Heritage produced the general scheme of an Electoral Reform Bill, which was approved by the cabinet on 30 December 2020 and published on 8 January 2021. The scheme was submitted for pre-legislative scrutiny to an Oireachtas Joint Committee, which had public meetings with invited parties between 23 January and 22 June and issued its report in August.

The draft bill sought both to modernise the electoral register and to establish an electoral commission with seven to nine members and a permanent staff. The establishment provisions are modelled on the Policing Authority established in 2015.

The commission would comprise:

- five to seven members appointed by the President of Ireland:
  - the chairperson, a current or former judge of the superior courts, nominated by the Chief Justice, appointed for a seven-year term;
  - four to six experts recommended by the Commission for Public Service Appointments and nominated by the government with Oireachtas approval for a four-year term
- two ex officio members:
  - the Ombudsman
  - the Clerk of Dáil Éireann or Seanad Éireann, alternating every four years;

The commission's staff would be members of the Civil Service of the State, with a Chief Executive recommended by the Commission for Public Service Appointments.

=== Envisaged functions ===
The Constitutional Convention took the Australian Electoral Commission and UK Electoral Commission as case studies of possible models for the Irish body. The various official reports listed functions which might be performed by the commission, and noted who is currently responsible for them. The bill published in 2021 would give some of these as "initial functions" to the commission it establishes, leaving open the possibility for others to be transferred to it at a later date. Academics addressing a pre-legislative scrutiny meeting said the bill lacked ambition and the commission's structure left it "little room for expansion" to new activities.

Function	Otherwise done by	Suggested by (Note: DECLG= Consultation paper 2015; Oir = Oireachtas committee report 2016, pp.iii–iv, 34–35; PFG = Programme for Government 2016 pp.152–3; RIA = Summary of Regulatory Impact Analysis, p.6 §1.1)	In 2021 bill?	Notes
Referendum campaigns	Referendum Commission	DECLG, Oir, PFG, RIA	Initial	Under pre-2021 law, a new Referendum Commission is created and dissolved for each referendum.
Constituency boundaries	Constituency Commission and Local Electoral Area Boundary Committees	DECLG, Oir, RIA	Initial	Under pre-2021 law, new commissions or committees are created and dissolved for each periodic boundary review.
Voter education and participation	"Generally absent"	DECLG, Oir, PFG, RIA	Initial	The 2016 government programme says the commission should "look at ways to increase participation in our political process through voter education and turnout".
Maintaining the register of political parties	Clerk of the Dáil	DECLG, Oir, PFG, RIA	Initial	
Policy, strategy, and research	Franchise Section of the Department of Housing, Local Government and Heritage	Oir, RIA	Initial	The Oireachtas report emphasises independent research. The 2018 report of the Interdepartmental Group on the Security of Ireland's Electoral Process and Disinformation suggested some policy functions would remain within the Department of Housing, Planning and Local Government.
Maintaining the electoral register	Local authorities and the Franchise Section	DECLG, Oir, PFG, RIA	Initial (oversight)	The 2021 bill includes wide-ranging reforms to the registration process, with local authorities retaining some responsibility under the supervision of the new electoral commission.
Countering electoral fraud, post-truth politics, foreign electoral intervention			Initial (partial)	The 2018 report of the Interdepartmental Group on the Security of Ireland's Electoral Process and Disinformation foresees a role for the Electoral Commission. The 2021 bill scheme gives the commission "a key role in relation to the regulation of online political advertising during election periods", which was praised by Michela Palese of the British Electoral Reform Society. The commission would have power to investigate but not to adjudicate or impose penalties, and could initiate criminal proceedings only with the consent of the Director of Public Prosecutions.
Returning officers	County registrars and sheriffs	DECLG, RIA	Future	The RIA suggested existing returning officers would continue, under supervision from the Electoral Commission.
Monitoring of campaign financing	Standards in Public Office Commission	DECLG, Oir, PFG, RIA	Future	
Publication of results	Returning officers, Franchise Section	Oir, RIA		Returning officers publish summaries in Iris Oifigiúil shortly after the poll; the department publishes detailed results later. The Oireachtas report addresses real-time official publication online.
Elections to the Seanad	Vocational panel elections are overseen by the clerk of the Seanad; elections for NUI and Dublin U are overseen by respective universities	DECLG		The working group established after the defeat of the 2013 Seanad abolition referendum reported in 2015 on proposed reforms, which included radical changes in the Seanad electoral system and the creation of a "Seanad Electoral Commission" to oversee this. The working group's report recognised that the Electoral Commission already proposed by the government would, if established, make a separate Seanad Electoral Commission unnecessary. Consideration of a private member's bill to extend the franchise for university constituencies was adjourned in November 2020 to await the Electoral Commission's establishment.
Standards for electronic voting	N/A			Recommended in 2005 by the Commission on Electronic Voting formed after the abortive 2003 e-voting trial.
