= Household Finance and Consumption Survey (Ireland) =

Statistical survey in Ireland

The Household Finance and Consumption Survey (HFCS) is a statistical survey conducted by the Central Statistics Office (CSO) on behalf of the Central Bank of Ireland as part of the European Central Bank (ECB) Household Finance and Consumption Network (HFCN).

The HFCS is designed to collect household-level data on households’ finances and consumption, and is required by all Eurozone countries to facilitate comparable data analysis for the Euro area as a whole.

== Household Finance and Consumption Survey 2013 ==
The 2013 HFCS study was the first conducted in Ireland, carried out between March and September 2013 with 5,419 respondent households.

Results of the 2013 study were released in January 2015 by the Central Statistics Office.

Survey data is available on the CSO website in PDF format.

== Methodology and scope ==
The 2013 study sample size consisted of 5,419 respondent households.

The survey collected a range of household information from the adults taking the survey, including the following household characteristics at micro level:

- demographics
- real and financial assets
- liabilities
- consumption and saving
- income and employment
- future pension entitlements, intergenerational transfers and gifts
- attitudes to risk

== Main uses and aims ==
The HFCS is designed to find out more about household finance and consumption in Ireland.

HFCS aims to collect information to help policy-makers respond to a variety of questions concerning:

- Debt and financial pressures
- Portfolio choice and demand for assets
- Saving, liquidity constraints and the smoothing of consumption
- Computational finance
