= 1966 census of Ireland =

Irish population census in 1966

1966 Census of Ireland
- 17 April 1966
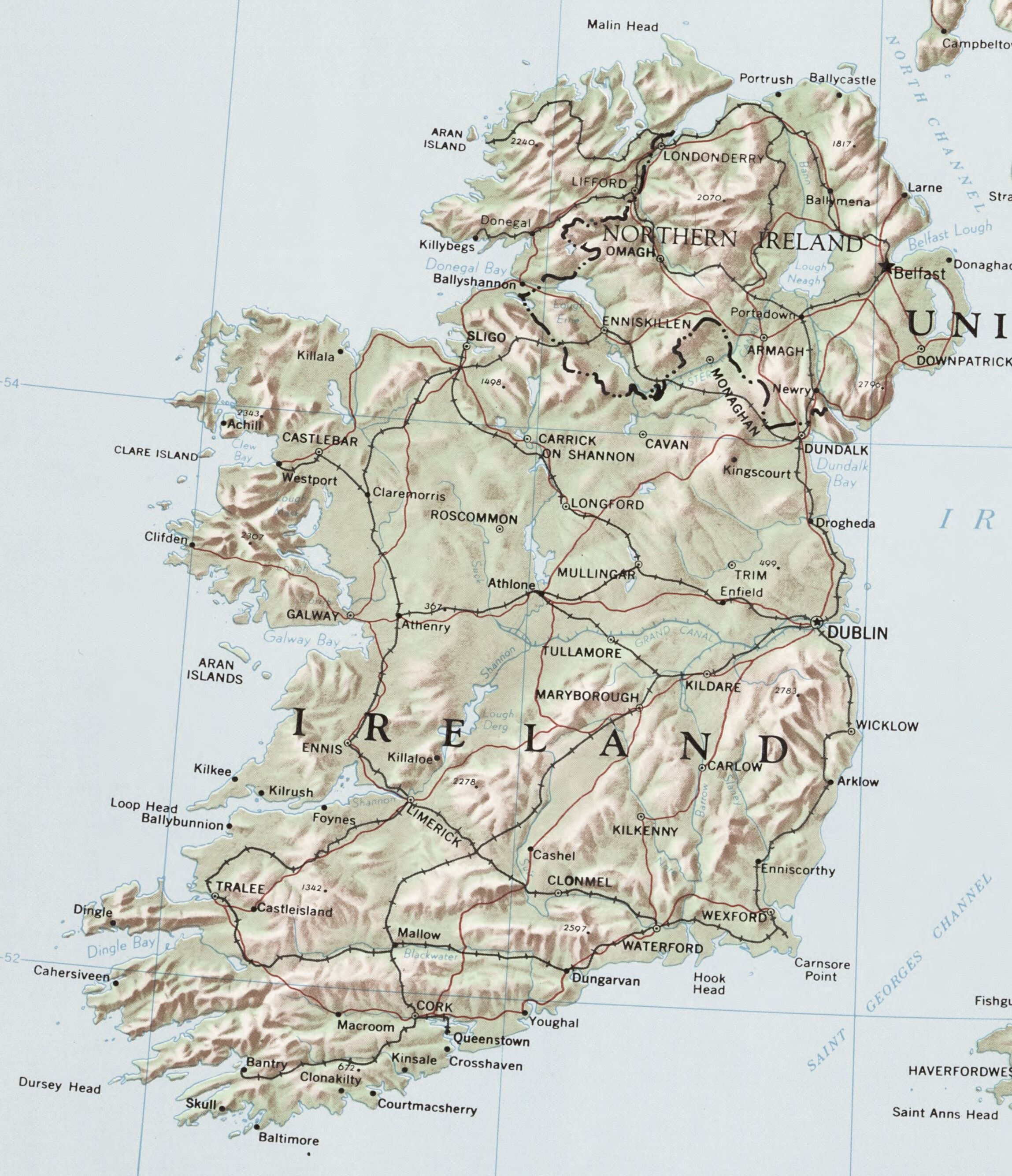
- Map of Ireland, 1961

General information
- Country: Ireland

Results
- Total population: 2,884,002 (▲2.3%)
- Most populous county: Dublin (795,047)
- Least populous county: Longford (28,989)

The 1966 Census of Ireland was held on 17 April 1966. It was organised by the Central Statistics Office (CSO) and reported a total population of 2,884,002, which was a 2.3% increase in a span of five years. The total population rebounded from a record low of 2,818,341 recorded in the 1961 census, although northern and western regions continued to steeply decline in population. The census results were released gradually across seven volumes between 1967 and 1970.

== Information collected ==
For each household surveyed, the 1966 census requested the number of rooms in the dwelling occupied by the household, as well as ten primary pieces of information on each individual present, which were:

- i - Name
- ii - Relationship to head of household
- iii - Sex
- iv - Date of birth
- v - Marital status
- vi - Principal occupation (for persons 14 years or older)
- vii - Employment status (whether employee, employer, etc.)
- viii - Name of employer and business
- ix - Area and rateable valuation of agricultural land held
- x - Age at which full-time education ended and name of school, college, etc. (for persons not in full-time education)

=== Release schedule ===
The seven volumes and their release schedule are as follows:

- Volume 1 - Population of DED's, towns and larger units of area (1967)
- Volume 2 - Ages and Conjugal conditions classified by areas (March 1968)
- Volume 3 - Industries (July 1968)
- Volume 4 - Occupations (January 1969)
- Volume 5 - Occupations and industries classified by areas and conjugal conditions (July 1969)
- Volume 6 - Housing and Households (December 1969)
- Volume 7 - Education (May 1970)

== Results ==
=== Population ===
The total population of the Republic of Ireland according to the 1966 census was 2,884,002 of whom 1,449,032 (50.24%) were male and 1,434,970 (49.76%) were female. The population breakdown by province and county, and by city, are outlined below. While the total national population increased by 2.3% since the 1961 census, there were large regional variations, with northern and western counties in particular continuing a steady trend of depopulation. County Dublin experienced rapid growth of over 10% during this period, while every county in Connacht and Ulster (Note: This refers to the three Ulster counties in the Republic of Ireland and does not apply to the six counties of Northern Ireland, which are in a separate jurisdiction and were not part of this census.) recorded a population decrease.

=== By province ===
Province	Flag	Irish name	Population (1966)	Density (km^{2})	Counties
Connacht	Connacht	Connachta; Cúige Chonnacht	401,950	22.7	5
Leinster	Leinster	Laighin; Cúige Laighean	1,414,415	71.4	12
Munster	Munster	Mumhain; Cúige Mumhan	859,334	34.8	6
Ulster (part of)	Ulster	Ulaidh; Cúige Uladh	208,313	25.8	3

=== By county ===
Rank	County	Population	Density (km^{2})	Province	Change since previous census
1	Dublin	795,047	862.3	Leinster	10.7%
2	Cork	339,703	45.2	Munster	2.7%
3	Galway	148,340	24.1	Connacht	-1.0%
4	Limerick	137,357	49.8	Munster	3.1%
5	Tipperary	122,812	28.5	Munster	-0.8%
6	Mayo	115,547	20.7	Connacht	-6.3%
7	Kerry	112,785	23.5	Munster	-3.2%
8	Donegal	108,549	22.3	Ulster	-4.6%
9	Wexford	83,437	35.3	Leinster	0.2%
10	Clare	73,597	21.3	Munster	-0.1%
11	Waterford	73,080	39.3	Munster	2.3%
12	Louth	69,519	84.2	Leinster	3.2%
–	South Tipperary	68,969	30.6	Munster	-1.6%
13	Meath	67,323	28.7	Leinster	3.4%
14	Kildare	66,404	39.2	Leinster	3.1%
15	Kilkenny	60,463	29.2	Leinster	-2.0%
16	Wicklow	60,428	29.8	Leinster	3.3%
17	Roscommon	56,228	22.1	Connacht	-5.0%
18	Cavan	54,022	28.0	Ulster	-4.5%
–	North Tipperary	53,843	26.3	Munster	0.3%
19	Westmeath	52,900	28.8	Leinster	0.1%
–	Dún Laoghaire Borough	51,772	2,876	Leinster	8.3%
20	Offaly	51,717	25.8	Leinster	0.4%
21	Sligo	51,263	27.9	Connacht	-4.3%
22	Monaghan	45,732	35.3	Ulster	-2.9%
23	Laoighis	44,595	25.9	Leinster	-1.1%
24	Carlow	33,593	37.5	Leinster	0.8%
25	Leitrim	30,572	19.2	Connacht	-8.7%
26	Longford	28,989	26.6	Leinster	-5.4%
Total	Ireland	2,884,002	41.0		2.3%
	Average	110,923			

=== By city ===
City	Population
Dublin	650,153
Cork	125,283
Limerick	58,082
Waterford	29,842
Galway	26,295

== Viewing the returns ==
The census returns of 1966 are confidential until 2066 due to Section 35, of the 1993 Statistics Act which bans the release of census return forms until 100 years after the enumeration date. However, the reports published by the Central Statistics Office and are available online from the CSO website to freely access.

== See also ==
- Census tract
- Demographics of the Republic of Ireland
- Irish population analysis
