= Rijnland Internet Election System =

RIES, for Rijnland Internet Election System, was a project and open source/open patent design and implementation of an Internet election system. RIES was used from 2004 to 2006 for formal elections of the Dutch District Water Boards, and in 2006 to allow expats to vote for the Dutch parliament elections through the Internet. Over 140,000 voters used Ries to cast their vote over the Internet, 19,815 of which were cast in the 2006 parliamentary election.

In June, 2008, based on the work of the group "We Don't Trust Voting Computers", Internet voting was banned in the Netherlands and RIES could no longer be used.

The source code was published in June, 2008, and was shown to have extensive security problems.

== See also ==
- Electronic voting examples#Netherlands
- Internet voting
