= Constituency Commission =

Statutory body in Ireland which advised on alterations to constituency boundaries

The Constituency Commission (Irish: An Coimisiún um Thoghlaigh) is an independent commission in Ireland which had advised on redrawing of constituency boundaries of Dáil constituencies for the election of members to Dáil Éireann (the house of representatives of the Oireachtas) and European Parliament constituencies prior to the establishment of the Electoral Commission in 2023. Each commission was established by the Minister for Housing, Planning and Local Government after the census. The Commission then submitted a non-binding report to the Oireachtas, and was dissolved. A separate but similar Local Electoral Area Boundary Committee fulfilled the same function for local electoral area boundaries of local government areas.

== History ==
Constituency revision is effected by an act of the Oireachtas (parliament) which enumerates the areas included within each constituency. Historically the act was drafted by the government of the day to favour its own party or parties, leading to allegations of gerrymandering by the opposition. The Electoral (Amendment) Act 1959 was struck out in 1961 by the High Court as being repugnant to the Constitution of Ireland because of excessive malapportionment. The hastily enacted replacement, the Electoral (Amendment) Act 1961, relied instead on manipulating district size; (Note: Where the Fianna Fáil party of the government had less than 50% support, four-seat constituencies were used, so that Fianna Fáil would win two of four seats; where it had more than 50% support, three- or five-seat constituencies would give it two of three, or three of five.) the Electoral (Amendment) Act 1974 attempted to do the same, but backfired when a larger-than-anticipated swing resulted in a landslide for the opposition in the 1977 general election. The incoming Taoiseach Jack Lynch promised that future boundary revisions take account of recommendations from an independent commission. Such commissions operated on an ad-hoc basis, beginning with the 1977 European constituency commission whose report was used for the 1979 election. The first Dáil commission's report informed the Electoral (Amendment) Act 1980.

The ad hoc system was superseded when the Electoral Act 1997 placed the Constituency Commission on a statutory footing with fixed terms of reference. These provisions of the 1997 Act were repealed by the Electoral Reform Act 2022. In 2023, the government established the Electoral Commission as a permanent statutory body under the Electoral Reform Act 2022. This assumed functions previously carried out by the Constituency Commission and Local Electoral Area Boundary Committees, as well as handling other functions relating to elections and referendums in the state.

== Composition ==
The 1997 Act, as amended, provided that the chairman of the commission would be a judge of the superior courts. The other members of the commission were the Clerk of the Dáil, the Clerk of the Seanad, the Ombudsman, and the Secretary General of the Department of Housing, Local Government and Heritage. The offices of the commission were in the Custom House, Dublin. The members of the last commission, constituted in 2016, were:

Name	Role / Office
Robert Haughton	Chairman and High Court judge
John McCarthy	Secretary General of the Department of the Housing, Planning, Community and Local Government
Peter Tyndall	Ombudsman
Peter Finnegan	Clerk of the Dáil
Martin Groves	Clerk of the Seanad

== Terms of reference ==
In relation to Dáil constituencies, the commission was required, in observing the relevant provisions of the Constitution of Ireland, to have regard to:

- the total number of members of the Dáil, subject to Article 16.2.2° of the Constitution, shall be not less than 166 and not more than 172;
- each constituency shall return three, four or five members;
- the breaching of county boundaries shall be avoided as far as practicable;
- each constituency shall be composed of contiguous areas;
- there shall be regard to geographic considerations including significant physical features and the extent of and the density of population in each constituency;
- the Commission shall endeavour to maintain continuity in relation to the arrangement of constituencies.

The Commission invited written submissions in relation to both Dáil and European Parliament constituencies from the general public and from each member of the Dáil and Seanad, and the members of the European Parliament from Ireland, registered political parties and Returning officers/County registrars.

The commission presented its report to the Chairman of the Dáil (Ceann Comhairle). The final determination of the constituencies for Dáil Éireann and the European Parliament is a matter for the Oireachtas to prescribe in legislation, as the commission's role was advisory.

== See also ==
- European Parliament constituency – Ireland
