= Scytl =

Provider of electronic voting systems

- Type: Private
- Industry: Electronic voting, Information Technology
- Founded: 2001; 25 years ago
- Headquarters: Barcelona, Spain
- Parent: Innovative Solutions Ecosystem (of Paragon Group)
- Subsidiaries: SOE Software
- Website: scytl.com

Scytl Election Technologies S.L.U. (also stylized SCYTL), is a Spanish electronic voting system and election technology company. Founded in 2001 in Barcelona, its products and services have been used in elections and referendums in many countries.

== Company ==
Scytl was founded in 2001, and grew from a cryptography research project at the Autonomous University of Barcelona. The name is a reference to the scytale, an ancient cryptographic tool.

Scytl became profitable in 2006, and in 2014 it reported 70% annual revenue growth. Scytl bought SOE Software in 2012, and two years later intended to go public, but delayed the IPO because of poor performance in developing markets. They decided to focus on markets in developed countries as well as on election solutions for non-government customers.

In 2017, Scytl reported having 600 employees, of which a third were based in Barcelona. In 2016, Scytl divided itself into three companies:

- The original Scytl Secure Electronic Voting: Develops voting software
- Scytl Voting Hardware SL: Develops voting hardware, is owned by Scytl, and an anonymous Dubai-based investor
- Civiti (formerly Open Seneca): Focuses on civic participation services.

The company's systems have been implemented in numerous countries, but problems have cropped up over the years in some of its solutions and voting systems, including those used in Australia, Ecuador, Norway, and Switzerland.

=== Investors ===
Scytl was funded by venture capital, and raised $9 million in 2006 from investors including Balderton Capital and Nauta Capital, and $104 million in 2014 in multiple funding rounds from investors including Vulcan Capital, Sapphire Ventures, Vy Capital, Adams Street Partners, and Industry Ventures. Paul Allen (co-founder of Microsoft with Bill Gates) invested $40 million in 2014.

=== Acquisitions ===
In 2012, Scytl acquired the American company SOE Software ("Supervisors of Elections"), located in Tampa. SOE implemented Scytl technologies in the United States.

In 2013, Scytl acquired the software division of Gov2U, a company partnered with the National Democratic Institute.

Scytl became a partner of Amazon Web Services by November 2018. They host their services on Amazon's cloud platform.

=== 2020 bankruptcy and purchase ===
On May 11, 2020, facing debts exceeding €75 million, Scytl initiated bankruptcy proceedings with the intention of selling its business to the U.S. investment fund Sandton Capital. On 2 June 2020, a Spanish court declared Scytl bankrupt and started the process of auctioning off its assets.

In late October, the Paragon Group subsidiary "Service Point Solutions" (from December 2021, Innovative Solutions Ecosystem "ISE") acquired Scytl including its U.S. subsidiary SOE.

== Operations ==
=== Australia ===
In 2018, the authorities of New South Wales selected Scytl to provide the software for the state's "iVote" online voting system until 2022 for $1.9 million, which allowed Australians with disabilities and voters with accessibility problems to vote remotely. During the 2015 election, researchers uncovered vulnerabilities in the iVote system which could be used to manipulate votes, violate ballot privacy and subvert the verification mechanism. However, in a public statement, the NSW Electoral Commission clarified that the vulnerability was not related to the online voting system but to the publicly accessible SSL certificate on the Piwik website, the web analytics tool used by the Commission.

=== Ecuador ===
Scytl ran voting machines in several parts of Ecuador in 2014. They were supposed to produce results within 72 hours, but ran into a variety of problems and took over a month.

=== European Union ===
In 2014, a consortium created by Scytl and TNS opinion provided real-time electoral projections and results consolidation and dissemination across the 28 EU Member States for the European Parliament Elections held on May 22–25, 2014. The consortium collected and processed election results from all Member States providing a multi-lingual website in 24 official languages for the publication and dissemination of the European Parliament election results.

=== Malta ===
Scytl and Idox, provide the Maltese "eCount" electronic vote counting system, used first in 2019.

=== Norway ===
Scytl deployed electronic voting in Norway in 2011 in partnership with the government. A flaw in their cryptography was discovered in 2013, and 0.75% of all voters managed to vote twice in 2013, once online and once in a polling station.

In 2014, Norway abandoned Scytl's Internet Voting project, due to security failures, lack of increase in turnout, and high costs.

=== Spain ===
Scytl partnered with Technocom to provide results consolidation and publication technology in the 2015 Spanish General elections. In May 2019, Scytl will partner with Vector ITC to consolidate and publish the preliminary results of the municipal and European elections in Spain.

=== Switzerland ===
In a joint venture with Swiss Post, Scytl provides its sVote e-voting system to several cantons that allow Swiss citizens who live abroad to take part in cantonal and federal elections and referendums electronically. After the Canton of Geneva decided in 2018 to abandon the continued development of its own e-voting system, Swiss Post and Scytl remained the only e-voting providers then certified to provide e-voting services in Switzerland by the Swiss Federal Chancellery.

==== Criticism of the System ====
Scytl said its sVote system used in Switzerland is "universally verifiable", but its system has been criticized as overly complex, difficult to audit, and not sufficiently transparent. After Swiss authorities launched a public code review, a group of researchers of the University of Melbourne, Université catholique de Louvain, and the Open Privacy Research Society reported in March 2019 that they discovered a deficiency in the leaked version of the source code that would allow the system's operator to alter votes undetected. Additionally, the Swiss security research group setuid(0) released several vulnerabilities in cooperation with the Swiss Post, including an issue where a system operator could execute arbitrary code on the e-voting servers. Because of the deficiencies, Swiss authorities disallowed the use of Scytl's e-voting system in the Swiss referendums of 19 May 2019, and it has not been used since. Swiss Post purchased the rights to the software from Scytl in 2020 as the company faced bankruptcy.

=== United States ===
In the 2016 United States elections, Scytl's technologies were used statewide in 12 U.S. states, and in another 980 local jurisdictions in 28 states.

==== 2020 United States Presidential Election ====
After President Donald Trump's defeat in the 2020 United States presidential election, his attorney Sidney Powell repeated an allegation made by One America News Network, Congressman Louis Gohmert, and others that accurate voting results had been transmitted to a Scytl office in Germany, where they were supposedly tabulated to reveal a landslide victory for Trump, and that a company server had been seized in a raid by the United States Army. Scytl denied the allegations and the Army stated the raid allegation was false. Scytl affirmed having an office in Frankfurt, stating it was closed in September 2019.

=== United Arab Emirates ===
Scytl UAE has been involved in implementing digital voting solutions for the electoral process in the United Arab Emirates. As the primary partner in the UAE's initiative to digitize elections, Scytl UAE has provided the implementation of fully digital voting processes. Their online voting platform, introduced for the Federal National Council elections, allows Emirati citizens to cast their votes securely and conveniently from any internet-enabled device, including those residing outside the country.

=== Canada ===
In Canada, the electoral landscape is undergoing a transformative shift as Elections Nova Scotia enters into a significant partnership with Scytl Canada Inc., an international corporation specialising in online voting software. The $150,000 contract aims to develop a customized platform ahead of the next provincial election, with an additional $200,000 allocated for operational expenses during the electoral process. The collaboration is particularly significant following amendments to the Elections Act in 2021, permitting the use of internet voting for military members stationed outside Nova Scotia during elections. With Scytl's experience in developing internet voting software globally, this partnership attempts to modernize and improve the democratic experience in Nova Scotia.

== See also ==
- Dominion Voting Systems
