= Electoral Reform Act 2022 =

Irish law establishing Electoral Commission and other electoral reforms

Oireachtas
- Long title: An Act to provide for the establishment of An Coimisiún Toghcháin; to confer on the Commission certain functions in relation to the preparation and maintenance of the Register of Political Parties; to provide that the Commission shall explain, to the public, the subject matter of referendums; to provide that the Commission shall provide information, to the public, on electoral processes and encourage participation, by the public, in the democratic processes of the State; to provide for the review, by the Commission, of constituencies for the election of members to Dáil Éireann and to the European Parliament; to provide for the review, by the Commission, of local authority electoral area boundaries; to confer on the Commission a policy, research and advisory function; to provide that the Commission shall oversee the electoral register; to confer on the Commission the power to set standards for registration authorities and make recommendations to registration authorities or to the Minister in relation to the registration of electors; to modernise the arrangements for the registration of electors; to provide for continuous registration on the basis of individual application; to provide for necessary and appropriate data sharing to assist registration authorities in updating and maintaining the register; to provide for annual reporting by registration authorities to the Commission; to provide for a designated registration authority to manage a shared database for registration authorities to use in the performance of their functions; to provide for anonymous registration in certain limited cases; to provide a specific registration process for persons with no fixed address; to provide for a pending electors list for persons aged 16 and 17; to provide for the extension of postal voter categories to include special voters in certain circumstances; to provide a framework for the regulation of online political advertising during election periods by the Commission; to provide for the labelling of online political advertisements; to provide for transparency notices for online political advertisements; to confer on the Commission the power to monitor compliance, carry out investigations and take enforcement action under this Act in so far as it relates to online political advertising; to provide for a regulatory framework to protect the integrity of elections and referendums against the dissemination or publication of online disinformation, online misinformation and manipulative or inauthentic behaviour online; to facilitate elections during a pandemic or Covid-19; to provide for polling on the islands; to amend the Electoral Act 1997 to enhance transparency in relation to certain donations to political parties and to provide, inter alia, for the preparation by political parties of consolidated annual statements of accounts; to provide for the holding of fundraising lotteries by political parties; and to provide for related matters.
- Citation: No. 30 of 2022
- Territorial extent: Ireland
- Passed by: Dáil
- Passed: 15 June 2022
- Passed by: Seanad
- Passed: 7 July 2022
- Signed by: President Michael D. Higgins
- Signed: 25 July 2022
- Commenced: Commenced in part: 13 October 2022; 1 January 2023; 9 February 2023; 1 November 2024

Legislative history

First chamber: Dáil
- Bill title: Electoral Reform Bill 2022
- Bill citation: No. 37 of 2022
- Introduced by: Minister for Housing, Local Government and Heritage (Darragh O'Brien)
- Introduced: 30 March 2022
- Committee responsible: Housing, Local Government and Heritage
- First reading: 30 March 2022
- Second reading: 30 March 2022
- Considered by the Housing, Local Government and Heritage Committee: 31 May 2022; 1 June 2022
- Report and Final Stage: 15 June 2022

Second chamber: Seanad
- Second reading: 21 June 2022
- Considered in committee: 30 June 2022; 6 July 2022
- Report and Final Stage: 7 July 2022

Final stages
- Seanad amendments considered by the Dáil: 13 July 2022
- Voting summary: 79 voted for; 61 voted against
- Finally passed both chambers: 13 July 2022

Summary
- Establishes an electoral commission to oversee all aspects of elections and referendums and introduces other electoral reforms
- Status: Not fully in force

The Electoral Reform Act 2022 is a law of Ireland which amended electoral law and provided for the establishment of an electoral commission titled An Coimisiún Toghcháin (The Electoral Commission).

== 2021 draft bill ==
Negotiations after the February 2020 general election led to the formation in June of a Fianna Fáil–Fine Gael–Green coalition, whose programme for government promised an electoral commission by the end of 2021. Malcolm Noonan was appointed as Minister of State at the Department of Housing, Local Government and Heritage with responsibility for heritage and electoral reform.

The Department of Housing, Local Government and Heritage produced the general scheme of an Electoral Reform Bill, which was approved by the cabinet on 30 December 2020 and published on 8 January 2021. The scheme was submitted for pre-legislative scrutiny to an Oireachtas Joint Committee, which had public meetings with invited parties between 23 January and 22 June and issued its report in August.

The draft bill sought both to modernise the electoral register and to establish an electoral commission with seven to nine members and a permanent staff. The establishment provisions are modelled on the Policing Authority established in 2015.

The commission would comprise:

- five to seven members appointed by the President of Ireland:
  - the chairperson, a current or former judge of the superior courts, nominated by the Chief Justice, appointed for a seven-year term;
  - four to six experts recommended by the Commission for Public Service Appointments and nominated by the government with Oireachtas approval for a four-year term
- two ex officio members:
  - the Ombudsman
  - the Clerk of Dáil Éireann or Seanad Éireann, alternating every four years;

The commission's staff would be members of the Civil Service of the State, with a Chief Executive recommended by the Commission for Public Service Appointments.

The Electoral Reform Bill 2022 was published and introduced to the Dáil on 30 March 2022. Its second reading was on 5–7 April, whereupon it was referred to the Select Committee on Housing, Local Government and Heritage for committee stage, held on 31 May and 1 June. The bill completed remaining Dáil stages on 15 June, and Seanad stages on 21 and 30 June and 6 and 7 July. The Dáil accepted the Seanad amendments on 13 July, and the bill was signed into law by the President on 25 July.
