= Policing and Community Safety Authority =

Police governance and oversight body in Ireland

The Policing and Community Safety Authority (Irish: An tÚdarás Póilíneachta agus Sábháilteachta Pobail) is a statutory body in Ireland with certain powers of governance and oversight of the police and security service of the country, the Garda Síochána. It was established in 2025 as a successor to the Policing Authority and the Garda Síochána Inspectorate. The Garda Síochána is also answerable to the government through the Minister for Justice, while complaints about the actions of members of the force can be directed to the Fiosrú – the Office of the Police Ombudsman.

== History ==
The Policing and Community Safety Authority replaced two separate bodies; the Garda Síochána Inspectorate and the Policing Authority.

=== Garda Síochána Inspectorate ===
The Garda Síochána Inspectorate was established in 2006 under the Garda Síochána Act 2005. Its stated role was to "ensure that the resources available to the Garda Síochána are used efficiently and effectively". Its inspections were either self-initiated, or requested by the Minister for Justice or the Policing Authority. The first Chief Inspector was former Commissioner of Boston Police, Kathleen O'Toole. She reported directly to the Minister for Justice. From 2006 to 2009, O'Toole was supported by two other inspectors, Robert Olsen and Gwen M. Boniface. Olsen was Chief of Police for 8 years of the Minneapolis Police Department. Boniface is a former Commissioner of the Ontario Provincial Police and was one of 3 female police commissioners in Canada when appointed in May 1998. She suggested that rank and file Gardaí were not equipped to perform their duties or protect themselves properly. She also suggested that routine arming may become a reality but dismissed the suggestion that this was currently being considered. In 2012, O'Toole was succeeded by Robert K. Olson.

=== Policing Authority ===
The Policing Authority was established in 2016, enabled by an amendment to the Garda Síochána Act 2005 by the Garda Síochána (Policing Authority and Miscellaneous Provisions) Act 2015. The authority was led by a board of 8 ordinary members and a chairperson. The first chair of the new authority was Josephine Feehily, the outgoing chair of the Revenue Commissioners. The authority published reports on the progress of the Gardaí against its objectives. The potential of the former authority to meet the objectives claimed for it have been questioned, with one academic paper stating "It seems more accurate to describe it as an elaborate national advisory body rather than a national police authority. Despite the Irish government's initial endorsement of the latter, it is likely that it never intended anything other than the former."

=== Policing and Community Safety Authority ===
On 2 April 2025, the Policing Authority and the Garda Síochána Inspectorate were dissolved and their functions were transferred to the newly established Policing and Community Safety Authority. Its first Chair was Dr Elaine Byrne BL.

== Functions ==
The authority oversees the working of the Garda force, including holding a monthly meeting with the Garda Commissioner. It promotes the improvement and reputation of the Garda. The body also has a role in nominating candidates for the roles of commissioner and deputy commissioner, and makes the appointments for the ranks of assistant commissioner, chief superintendent and superintendent, as well as certain senior civilian positions.
