= Nedap =

Dutch technology company

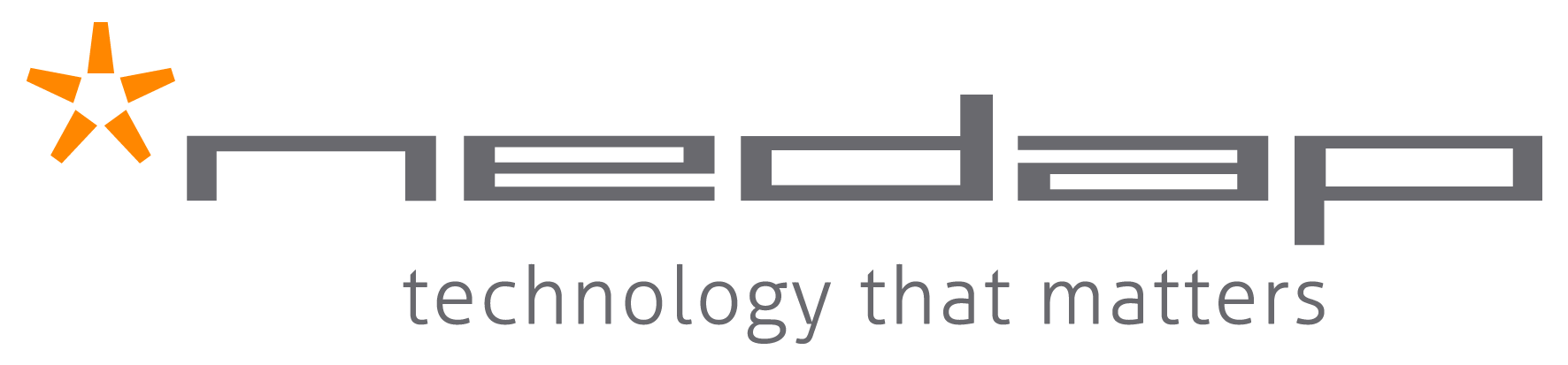
- Company type: Multinational
- Industry: Technology
- Founded: 1929
- Headquarters: Netherlands

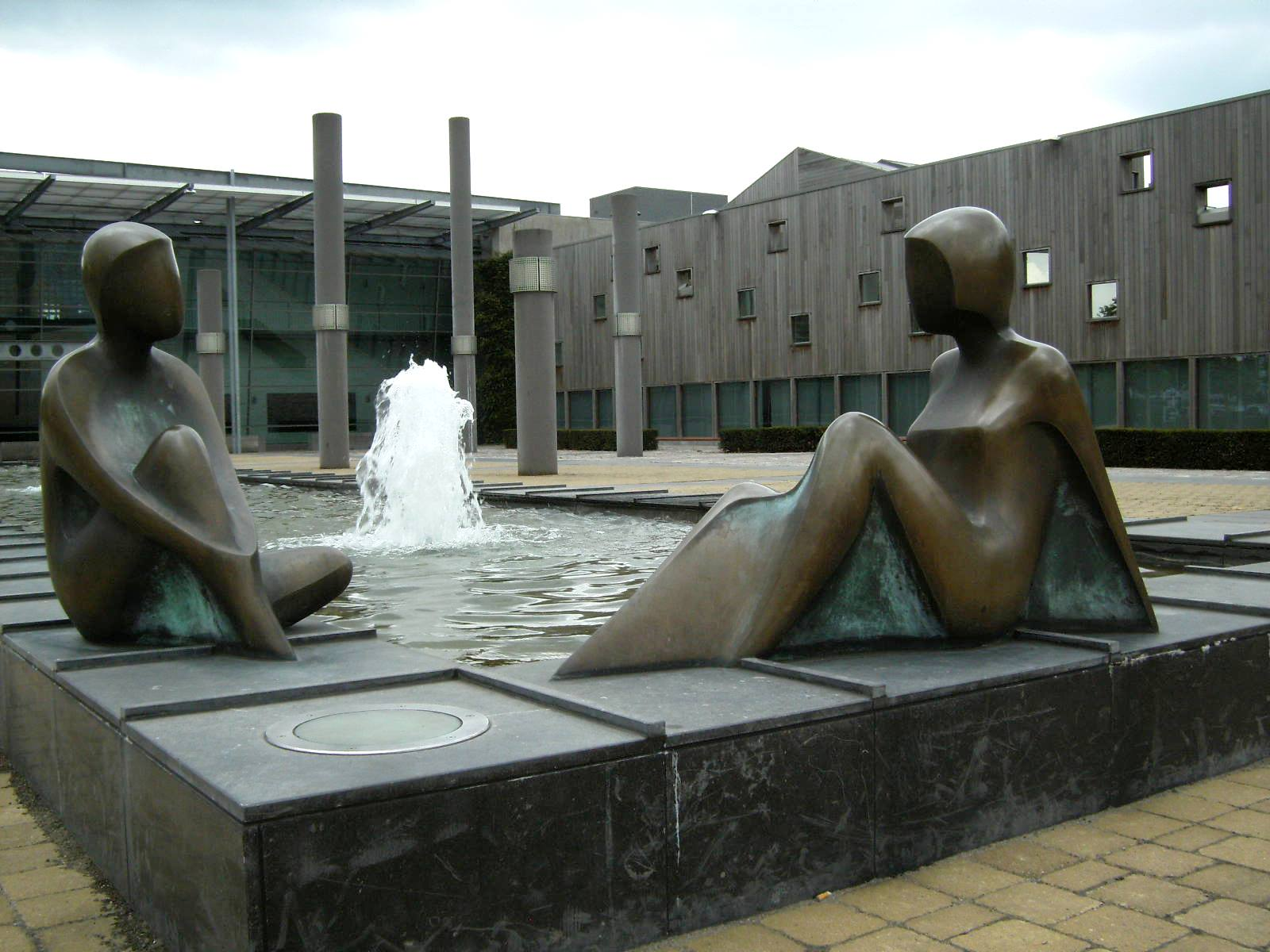
Fountain at the main entrance of Nedap, Groenlo.

Nedap (N.V. Nederlandsche Apparatenfabriek; Euronext: NEDAP) is a Dutch multinational technology company. Its principal place of business is Groenlo, Netherlands. It has subsidiaries in the United States, Belgium, France, Germany, UK, the Netherlands and Spain, and is listed on the Euronext exchange.

The company develops and supplies technologies in the fields of people & vehicle identification, access control systems, farm automation, Radio-frequency identification (RFID) systems for loss prevention and stock management, and software for management, healthcare and flextime working.

Nedap's activities are organized in the following Market Groups: Healthcare, Light Controls, Identification Systems, Livestock Management, Retail, Security Management and Staffing Solutions.

== History and Shareholders ==
Nedap was established in 1929 and has been listed on the Euronext stock exchange since 1947. As of 2022, the company has over 800 employees and is active around the world. According to Nedap's annual report for 2021, it has the following shareholders:

- Cross Options Beheer B.V. 14.61%
- Teslin Participaties Coöperatief U.A. 10.19%
- Kempen Capital Management N.V. 10.00%
- NN Group N.V. 9.97%
- ASR Nederland N.V. 8.20%
- Decico B.V. 5.01%
- Nedap N.V. 4.14%
- Add Value Fund N.V. 3.36%
