= Central Statistics Office (Ireland) =

Ireland's principal government institution in charge of statistics and census data

- An Priomh Oifig-Staidrimh
- The logo of the Central Statistics Office

National statistical agency overview
- Formed: 1 June 1949; 77 years ago
- Preceding national statistical agency: Statistics Branch
- Type: Non-ministerial government department
- Jurisdiction: Republic of Ireland
- Headquarters: Skehard Road, Cork T12 X00E, Ireland
- National statistical agency executive: Jennifer Banim, Director General
- Website: cso.ie

The Central Statistics Office (CSO; Irish: An Phríomh-Oifig Staidrimh) is the statistical agency responsible for the gathering of "information relating to economic, social and general activities and conditions" in the Republic of Ireland (it does not operate in Northern Ireland), in particular the census which is held every five years. The office is answerable to the Taoiseach and has its main offices in Cork. The Director General of the CSO is Jennifer Banim.

== History ==
The CSO was established on a statutory basis in 1994 to reduce the number of separate offices responsible for collecting statistics for the state.

The CSO had existed, as an independent ad hoc office within the Department of the Taoiseach, from June 1949, and its work greatly increased in the following decades, particularly from 1973 with the Republic of Ireland joining the European Economic Community (EEC). Previous to the 1949 reforms, statistics were collected by the Statistics Branch of the Department of Industry and Commerce on the creation of the Irish Free State in 1922. The Statistics Branch amalgamated a number of statistics gathering organisations that had existed in Ireland since 1841, when the first comprehensive census was undertaken by the Irish Constabulary (later renamed as the Royal Irish Constabulary).

On 15 September 2020, on the advice of the Central Statistics Office, the Irish Government postponed the quinquennial population census, originally scheduled for 18 April 2021, until 3 April 2022 because of health and logistical obstacles caused by the COVID-19 pandemic.

== Head of the Office ==
The current Director-General of the Central Statistics Office is Jennifer Banim.

== Household Finance and Consumption Survey ==
In 2013, the first ever Household Finance and Consumption Survey (HFCS) was conducted in the Republic of Ireland by the CSO on behalf of the Central Bank of Ireland as part of the European Central Bank (ECB) HFCS scheme/network.

== See also ==
- NUTS statistical regions of Ireland
- Leprechaun economics
- Irish modified GNI (or GNI star)
- Northern Ireland Statistics and Research Agency
