= Vote counting =

Process of counting votes in an election

Vote counting is the process of counting votes in an election. It can be done manually or by machines. In the United States, the compilation of election returns and validation of the outcome that forms the basis of the official results is called canvassing.

Counts are simplest in elections where just one seat is being filled and only a few candidates are on the ballot, and these are often counted manually. In elections where many seats are being filled on the same ballot, counts are often done by computers to give quick results. Tallies done at distant locations must be carried or transmitted accurately to the central election office.

Manual counts are usually accurate within one percent. Computers are at least that accurate, except when they have undiscovered bugs, broken sensors scanning the ballots, paper misfeeds, or hacks. Officials keep election computers off the internet to minimize hacking, but the manufacturers are on the internet. They and their annual updates are still subject to hacking, like any computers. Further, voting machines are in public locations on election day, and often the night before, so they are vulnerable.

Paper ballots and computer files of results are stored until they are tallied, so they need secure storage, which is hard. The election computers themselves are stored for years, and briefly tested before each election.

Despite the challenges to the U.S. voting process integrity in recent years, including claims by Republican Party members of error or voter fraud in 2020 and 2021, a robust examination of the voting process in U.S. states, including Arizona (where claims were most strenuous), found no basis in truth for those claims. The absence of error and fraud is partially attributable to the inherent checks and balances in the voting process itself, which are, as with democracy, built into the system to reduce their likelihood.

== Manual counting ==
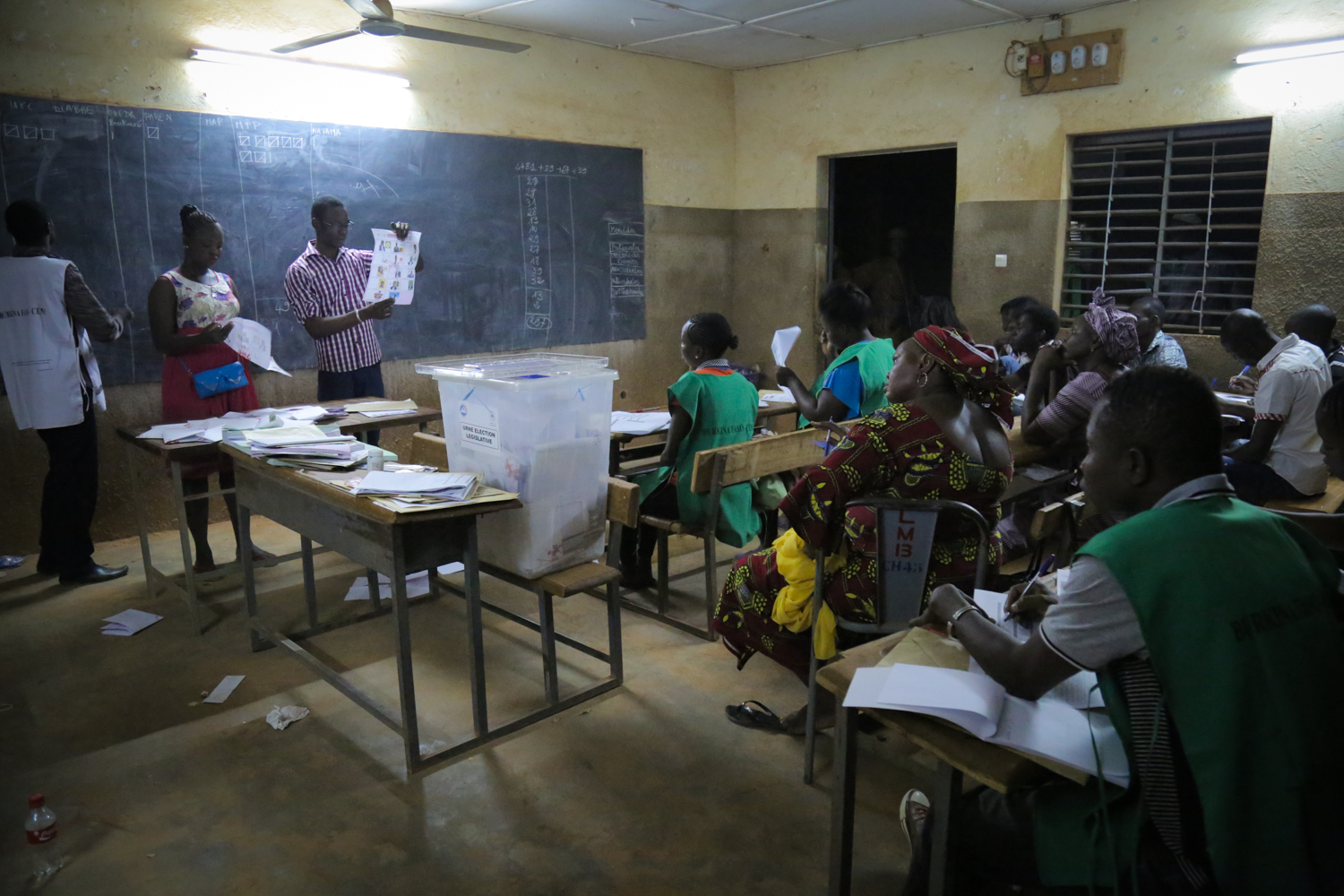
Counting ballots, Ouagadougou, 2015

Manual counting, also known as hand-counting, requires a physical ballot that represents voter intent. The physical ballots are taken out of ballot boxes and/or envelopes, read and interpreted; then results are tallied. Manual counting may be used for election audits and recounts in areas where automated counting systems are used.

=== Manual methods ===
One method of manual counting is to sort ballots in piles by candidate, and count the number of ballots in each pile. If there is more than one contest on the same sheet of paper, the sorting and counting are repeated for each contest. This method has been used in Burkina Faso, Russia, Sweden, United States (Minnesota), and Zimbabwe.

A variant is to read aloud the choice on each ballot while putting it into its pile, so observers can tally initially, and check by counting the piles. This method has been used in Ghana, Indonesia, and Mozambique. These first two methods do not preserve the original order of the ballots, which can interfere with matching them to tallies or digital images taken earlier.

Another approach is for one official to read all the votes on a ballot aloud, to one or more other staff, who tally the counts for each candidate. The reader and talliers read and tally all contests, before going on to the next ballot. A variant is to project the ballots where multiple people can see them to tally.

Another approach is for three or more people to look at and tally ballots independently; if a majority (Arizona) or all (Germany) agree on their tallies after a certain number of ballots, that result is accepted; otherwise they re-tally.

A variant of all approaches is to scan all the ballots and release a file of the images, so anyone can count them. Parties and citizens can count these images by hand or by software. The file gives them evidence to resolve discrepancies. The fact that different parties and citizens count with independent systems protects against errors from bugs and hacks. A checksum for the file identifies true copies. Election machines which scan ballots typically create such image files automatically, though those images can be hacked or be subject to bugs if the election machine is hacked or has bugs. Independent scanners can also create image files. Copies of ballots are known to be available for release in many parts of the United States. The press obtained copies of many ballots in the 2000 Presidential election in Florida to recount after the Supreme Court halted official recounts. Different methods resulted in different winners.

=== When manual counts happen ===
The tallying may be done at night at the end of the last day of voting, as in Britain, Canada, France, Germany, and Spain, or the next day, or 1–2 weeks later in the US, after provisional ballots have been adjudicated.

If counting is not done immediately, or if courts accept challenges which can require re-examination of ballots, the ballots need to be securely stored, which is problematic.

Australia federal elections count ballots at least twice, at the polling place and, starting Monday night after election day, at counting centres.

=== Errors in manual counts ===
Hand counting has been found to be slower and more prone to error than other counting methods.

Repeated tests have found that the tedious and repetitive nature of hand counting leads to a loss of focus and accuracy over time. A 2023 test in Mohave County, Arizona used 850 ballots, averaging 36 contests each, that had been machine-counted many times. The hand count used seven experienced poll workers: one reader with two watchers, and two talliers with two watchers.

The results included 46 errors not noticed by the counting team, including:

- Caller called the wrong candidate, and both watchers failed to notice the incorrect call
- Tally markers tried to work out inconsistencies while tallying
- Tally markers marked a vote for an incorrect candidate and the watchers failed to notice the error
- Caller calling too fast resulted in double marking a candidate or missed marking a candidate
- Caller missed calling a vote for a candidate and both watchers failed to notice the omission
- Watchers not watching the process due to boredom or fatigue
- Illegible tally marking caused incorrect tally totaling
- Enunciation of names caused incorrect candidate tally
- Using incorrect precinct tally sheets to tally ballots resulted in incorrect precinct level results.

Similar tallying errors were reported in Indiana and Texas election hand counts. Errors were 3% to 27% for various candidates in a 2016 Indiana race, because the tally sheet labels misled officials into over-counting groups of five tally marks, and officials sometimes omitted absentee ballots or double-counted ballots. 12 of 13 precincts in the 2024 Republican primary in Gillespie County, TX, were added or written down wrong after a hand count, including two precincts with seven contests wrong and one with six contests wrong. While the Texas errors were caught and corrected before results were finalized, the Indiana errors were not.

Average errors in hand-counted candidate tallies in New Hampshire towns were 2.5% in 2002, including one town with errors up to 20%. Omitting that town cut the average error to 0.87%. Only the net result for each candidate in each town could be measured, by assuming the careful manual recount was fully accurate. Total error can be higher if there were countervailing errors hidden in the net result, but net error in the overall electorate is what determines winners. Connecticut towns in 2007 to 2013 had similar errors up to 2%.

In candidate tallies for precincts in Wisconsin recounted by hand in 2011 and 2016, the average net discrepancy was 0.28% in 2011 and 0.18% in 2016.

India hand tallies paper records from a 1.5% sample of election machines before releasing results. For each voter, the machine prints the selected candidate on a slip of paper, displays it to the voter, then drops the slip into a box. In the April–May 2019 elections for the lower house of Parliament, the Lok Sabha, the Election Commission hand-tallied the slips of paper from 20,675 voting machines (out of 1,350,000 machines) and found discrepancies for 8 machines, usually of four votes or less. Most machines tally over 16 candidates, and they did not report how many of these candidate tallies were discrepant. They formed investigation teams to report within ten days, were still investigating in November 2019, with no report as of June 2021. Hand tallies before and after 2019 had a perfect match with machine counts.

An experiment with multiple types of ballots counted by multiple teams found average errors of 0.5% in candidate tallies when one person, watched by another, read to two people tallying independently. Almost all these errors were overcounts. The same ballots had errors of 2.1% in candidate tallies from sort and stack. These errors were equally divided between undercounts and overcounts of the candidates. Optical scan ballots, which were tallied by both methods, averaged 1.87% errors, equally divided between undercounts and overcounts. Since it was an experiment, the true numbers were known. Participants thought that having the candidate names printed in larger type and bolder than the office and party would make hand tallies faster and more accurate.

Intentional errors hand tallying election results are fraud. Close review by observers, if allowed, may detect fraud, and the observers may or may not be believed. If only one person sees each ballot and reads off its choice, there is no check on that person's mistakes. In the US only Massachusetts and the District of Columbia give anyone but officials a legal right to see ballot marks during hand counting. If fraud is detected and proven, penalties may be light or delayed. US prosecution policy since the 1980s has been to let fraudulent winners take office and keep office, usually for years, until convicted, and to impose sentencing level 8–14, which earns less than two years of prison.

In 1934, the United States had been hand-counting ballots for over 150 years, and problems were described in a report by Joseph P. Harris, who 20 years later invented a punched card voting machine,

"Recounts in Chicago and Philadelphia have indicated such wide variations that apparently the precinct officers did not take the trouble to count the ballots at all... While many election boards pride themselves upon their ability to conduct the count rapidly and accurately, as a general rule the count is conducted poorly and slowly... precinct officers conduct the count with practically no supervision whatever... It is impossible to fix the responsibility for errors or frauds... Not infrequently there is a mixup with the ballots and some uncertainty as to which have been counted and which have not... The central count was used some years ago in San Francisco... experience indicated that there is considerable confusion at the central counting place... and that the results are not more accurate than those obtained from the count by the precinct officer."

Errors in hand-counted tallies for candidates
Place	Year	Candidate tally errors, as % of votes counted	Reference Standard	Notes
New Hampshire towns	1946-1962	0.83%	careful hand recount	wtd avg is sum of absolute values of errors, divided by total ballots
New Hampshire towns	2002	2.49%	careful hand recount	20% in one town; others average 0.87%
Connecticut towns	2007-2013	up to 2%	investigations of differences between hand & machine counts	"routinely show up to 2% error"
Experiment, optical scan style ballots	2011	1.87%	Known values in experiment	As % of all 120 ballots, not candidate's ballots
Experiment, read to talliers	2011	0.48%	Known values in experiment	As % of all 120 ballots, not candidate's ballots
Experiment, sort & stack	2011	2.13%	Known values in experiment	As % of all 120 ballots, not candidate's ballots
Wisconsin precincts	2011	0.28%	careful hand recount	Table 6 "0.59% of the ballots" "out of 3,019" where 3,019 is total number of ballots
Wisconsin precincts	2016	0.18%	careful hand recount	Table 7a. "0.59% of the ballots" but 0.18% if exclude write-ins
Indiana, Jeffersonville	2016	3%-27%	Newspaper tally	Over-counted groups of 5 tally marks, and omitted or double-counted groups of ballots
Colorado audits	2018	0.8%	Consensus between election computer & Sec of State staff	Errors by audit boards in determining voter intent on individual ballots. No manual totals done.
Colorado audits	2019	0.2%	Consensus between election computer & Sec of State staff	Errors by audit boards in determining voter intent on individual ballots. No manual totals done.
India national election audit	2019	8 of 20,625 machines audited	Discrepancy between hand tally of VVPATs & election computers	They investigated and have not released analysis, so it is not clear how many of these were errors in hand tally.
Colorado audits	2020	0.6%	Consensus between election computer & Sec of State staff	Errors by audit boards in determining voter intent on individual ballots. No manual totals done.
Maricopa County, AZ audit	2021	15%	Paper-counting machine	Audit & machine count were contracted by state Senate
Mohave County, AZ, experiment	2023	0.15%	Logic & Accuracy Test ballots	46 errors were 0.15% of 30,600 contest totals on 850 test ballots.

Data in the table are comparable, because average error in candidate tallies as percent of candidate tallies, weighted by number of votes for each candidate (in NH) is mathematically the same as the sum of absolute values of errors in each candidate's tally, as percent of all ballots (in other studies).

=== Time needed and cost of manual counts ===
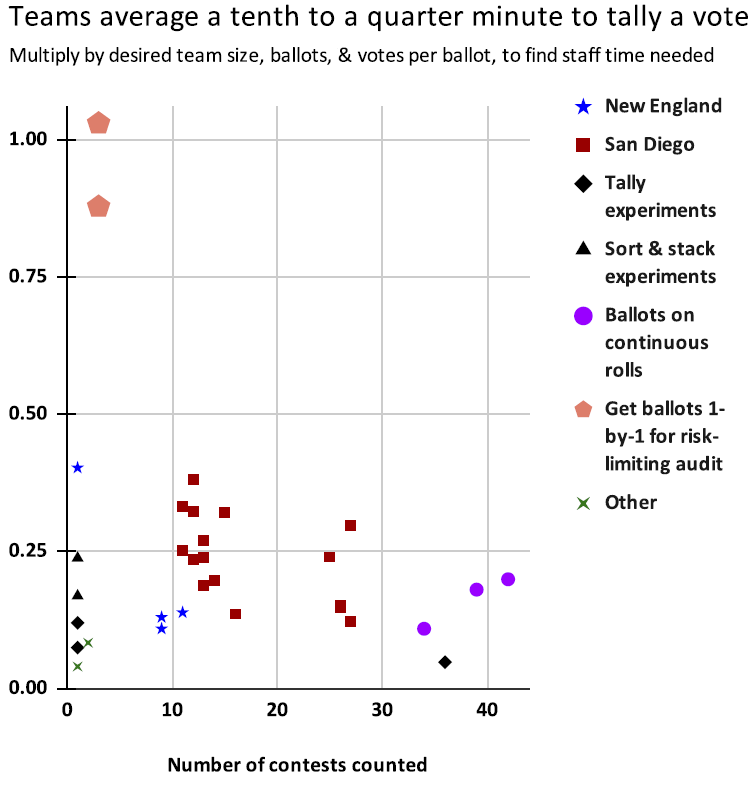
Time for hand counts: Minutes per vote counted

Cost depends on pay levels and staff time needed, recognizing that staff generally work in teams of two to four (one to read, one to watch, and one or two to record votes). Teams of four, with two to read and two to record are more secure and would increase costs. Three to record might more quickly resolve discrepancies, if 2 of the 3 agree.

Typical times in the table below range from a tenth to a quarter of a minute per vote tallied, so 24-60 ballots per hour per team, if there are 10 votes per ballot.

One experiment with identical ballots of various types and multiple teams found that sorting ballots into stacks took longer and had more errors than two people reading to two talliers.

Staff time needed for hand counts
	Team (wall clock) minutes per vote checked	Team size	Staff minutes per vote checked	Number of contests checked per ballot	Full precincts /batches, or random ballots	Type of paper ballot	Number of ballots checked	Total staff time, minutes	Year	Ref.	Overheads excluded & notes
Searcy Cnty, AR			8.47	1	Full batches	Sheets	1,700	14,400	2024		Team size & total errors not given. Hand & machine counts of Early Vote for Wes Bradford matched at 517, but certified results showed 520 and tally sheets showed 518. Two other ballots in a precinct batch were omitted from hand and machine counts. Total of 11 were uncounted.
Butler Cnty, PA, Butler City	0.02	6	0.09	8	Full batches	Sheets	600	450	2022		1 reads to 4–7. No report available, so times may be under-reported. Not on graph.
Butler Cnty, PA, Donegal Twp	0.02	4	0.08	8	Full batches	Sheets	1,061	660	2022		1 reads to 4–7. No report available, so times may be under-reported. Not on graph.
Dane County, WI	0.04	5	0.20	1	Full sets of images	Sheets	1000	200	2015		Organizing ballot scans for review, training, legal, supervision
Mohave County, AZ, experiment	0.05	7	0.34	36	Full batches	Sheets	850	10,266	2023		Excludes: detecting & retallying errors missed by team, space rental, paying workers to attend training, entering data on computer for web & SOS, creating blank tally sheets for each precinct. They estimate the following would add 33% to direct tallying cost: supervision, summation, sorting ballots by precinct, guards, transportation, background checks, webcams, recruitment
Maricopa County, AZ recount	0.08	5	0.42	2	Full batches	Sheets	1	0.83	2021		Organizing ballots for review, training, legal, supervision, adding tally sheets
New Hampshire	0.09	3	0.27	20	Full batches	Sheets	627	3,360	2007		Add 60% to cover: supervision 43% + training 13% + sums 4%
Carlisle, MA	0.11	2	0.22	9	Full batches	Sheets	3,670	7,200	2020		8 teams of 2 plus 4 extra
Hancock, MA	0.13	2	0.26	9	Full batches	Sheets	513	1,200	2020		Organizing ballots for review, training, legal, supervision, adding tally sheets (10 teams of 2
Provincetown, MA	0.14	2	0.28	11	Full batches	Sheets	2,616	7,980	2020		16 teams of 2+2 runners+4 tallies
Tolland, CT			0.11	7	Full batches	Sheets	3851	2,880	2012		
Bloomfield, CT			0.15	7	Full batches	Sheets	2272	2,400	2012		
Vernon, CT			0.31	6	Full batches	Sheets	2544	4,740	2012		
Bridgeport, CT	0.40	5	2.01	1	Full batches	Sheets	23860	48,000	2010		Includes counting number of voters who checked in at polling places, and comparing those counts to ballot counts.
Bibb County, GA	0.18	3	0.54	39	Full batches	Rolls	592	12,480	2006		
Camden County, GA	0.11	3	0.33	34	Full batches	Rolls	470	5,220	2006		
Cobb County, GA	0.20	3	0.60	42	Full batches	Rolls	976	24,480	2006		
San Diego precincts	0.22	3	0.67	19	Full batches	Sheets	2,425	30,573	2016		
Clark County, NV			0.72	21	Full batches	Rolls	1,268	19,200	2004		
Washington State recount			1.49	1	Full batches	Sheets	1,842,136	2,741,460	2004		
Orange County, CA			1.93	1	Full, mostly	Rolls mostly	467	900	2011		Independent count, done by graduate student on university computer
Read to Talliers Experiment Second Contest	0.07	4	0.30	1	Full batches	Sheets	1800	537	2012		Organizing ballots for review, training, legal, supervision, adding tally sheets
Read to Talliers Experiment First Contest	0.12	4	0.48	1	Full batches	Sheets	1800	861	2012		Organizing ballots for review, training, legal, supervision, adding tally sheets
Sort & Stack Experiment Second Contest	0.17	3	0.51	1	Full batches	Sheets	1920	972	2012		Organizing ballots for review, training, legal, supervision, adding tally sheets
Sort & Stack Experiment First Contest	0.24	3	0.71	1	Full batches	Sheets	1920	1,369	2012		Organizing ballots for review, training, legal, supervision, adding tally sheets
COUNTING BALLOTS IN RANDOM ORDER											
Carroll County, MD	1.03	2	2.06	3	Random images	Sheets	247	1,526	2016		Organizing ballot scans for review, training, legal, supervision
Montgomery County MD	0.88	2	1.76	3	Random images	Sheets	82	432	2016		Organizing ballot scans for review, training, legal, supervision
Merced County, CA			1.82	2	Random ballots	Sheets	198	720	2011		Independent count, done by graduate student on university computer
Humboldt County, CA			5.87	3	Random ballots	Sheets	143	2,520	2011		Independent count, done by graduate student on university computer

== Mechanical counting ==
Mechanical voting machines have voters selecting switches (levers), pushing plastic chips through holes, or pushing mechanical buttons which increment a mechanical counter (sometimes called the odometer) for the appropriate candidate.

There is no record of individual votes to check.

=== Errors in mechanical counting ===
Tampering with the gears or initial settings can change counts, or gears can stick when a small object is caught in them, so they fail to count some votes. When not maintained well the counters can stick and stop counting additional votes; staff may or may not choose to fix the problem. Also, election staff can read the final results wrong off the back of the machine.

== Electronic counting ==
Electronic machines for elections are being procured around the world, often with donor money. In places with independent election commissions, machines can add efficiency, though not usually transparency. Where the election commission is weaker, machines can be fetishized, waste money on kickbacks and divert attention, time and resources from harmful practices, as well as reducing transparency.

An Estonian study compared the staff, computer, and other costs of different ways of voting to the numbers of voters, and found highest costs per vote were in lightly used, heavily staffed early in-person voting. Lowest costs per vote were in internet voting and in-person voting on election day at local polling places, because of the large numbers of voters served by modest staffs. For internet voting they do not break down the costs. They show steps to decrypt internet votes and imply but do not say they are hand-counted.

=== Optical scan counting ===
Counting ballots by an optical scanner, San Jose, California, 2018

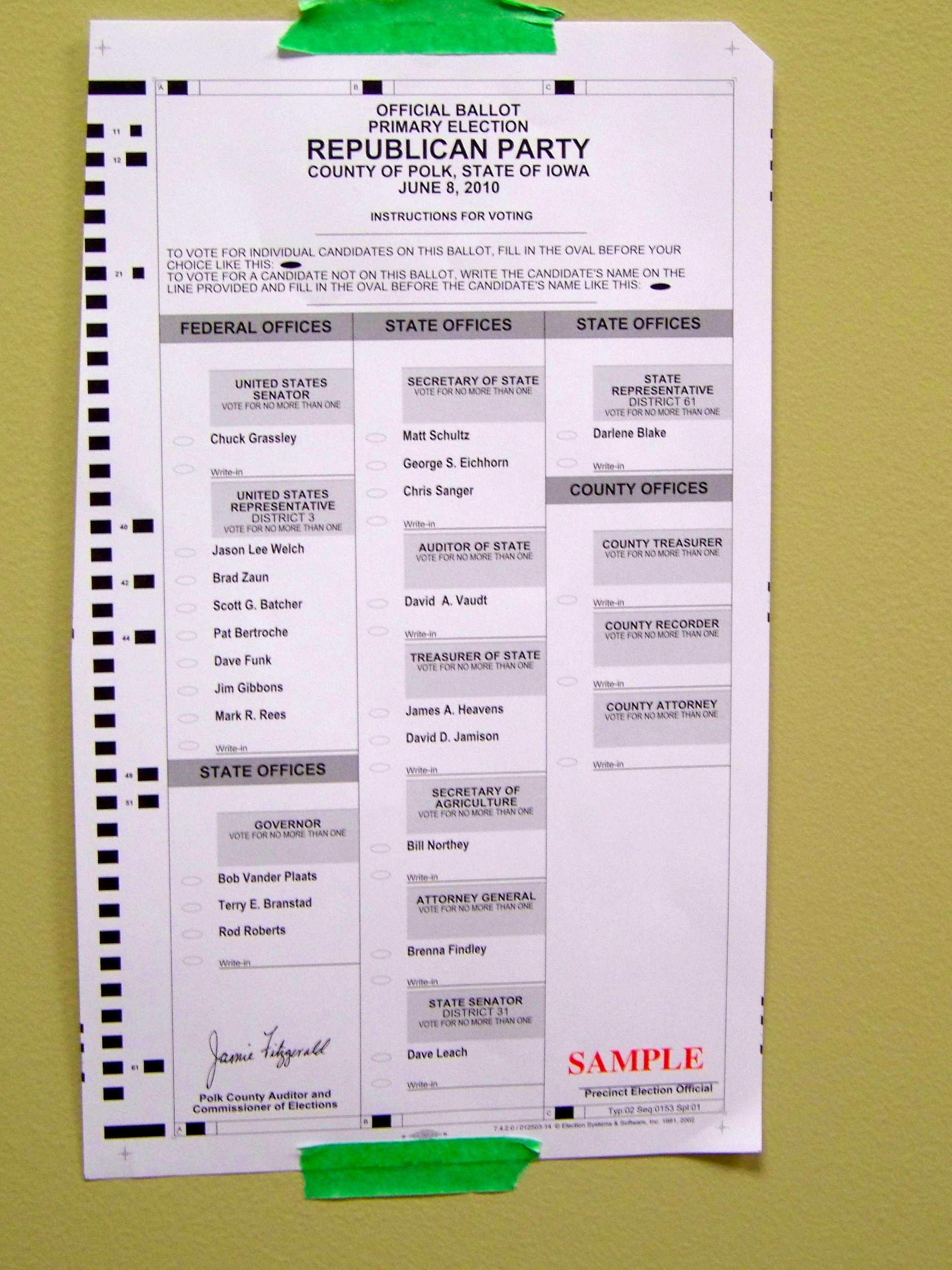
2010 Iowa Republican Primary ballot

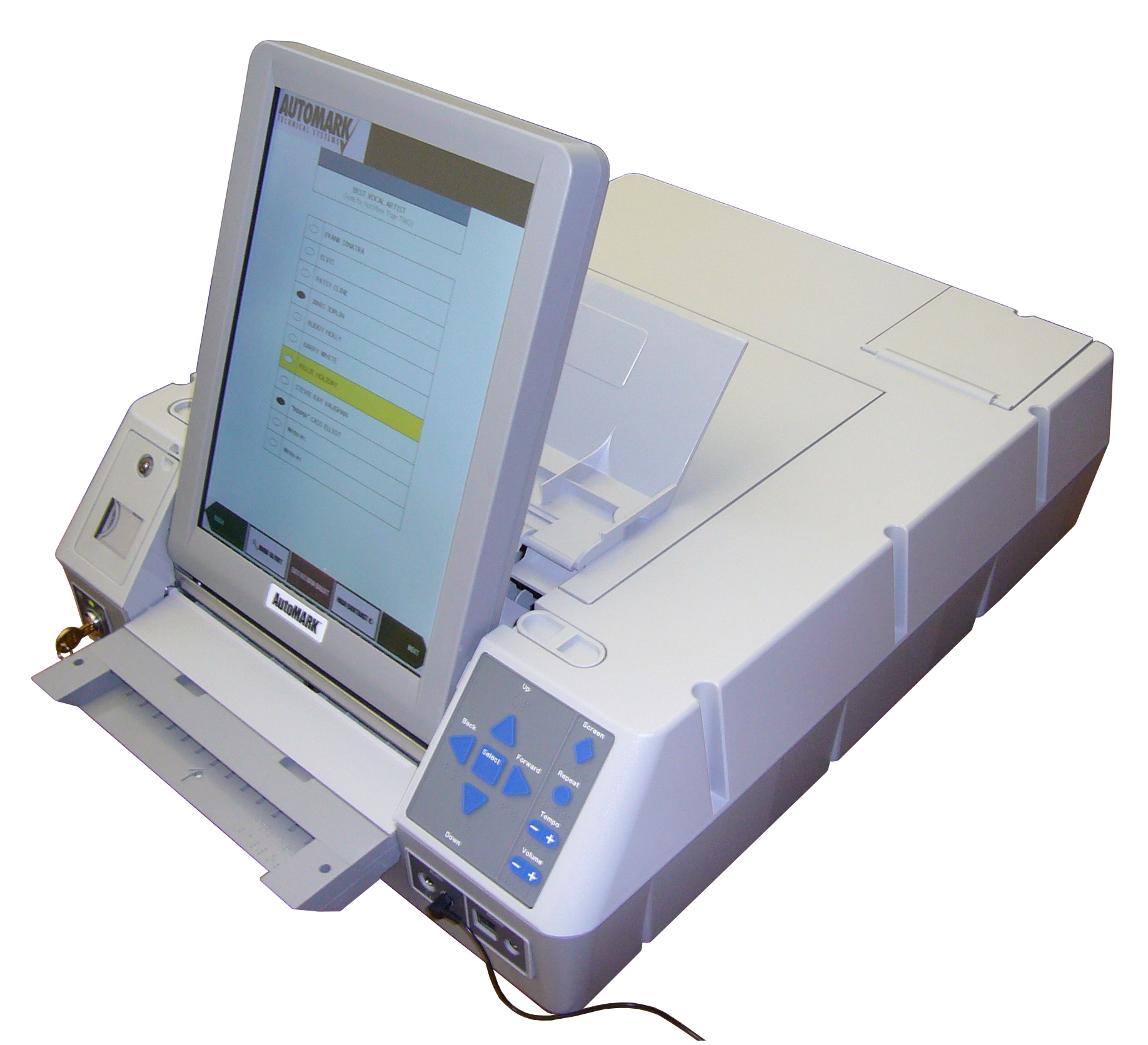
Ballot marking device

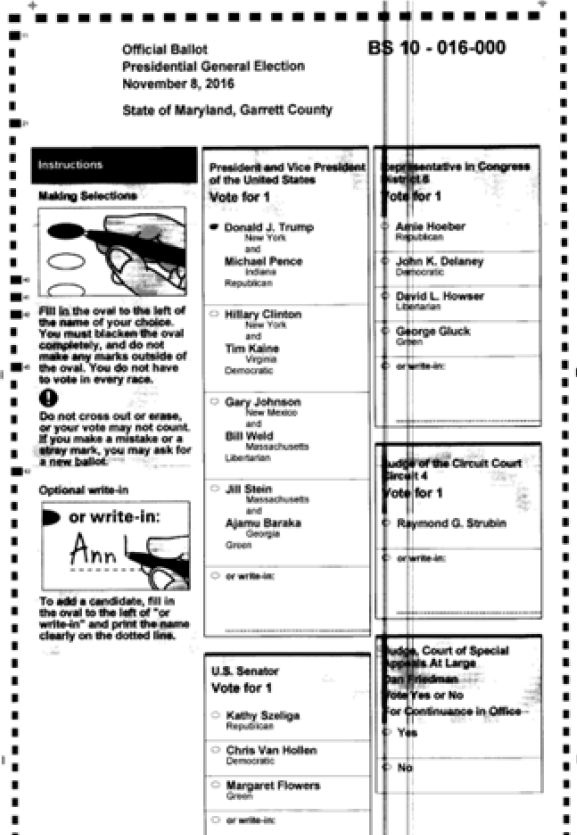
Scanner marked multiple candidates with black line

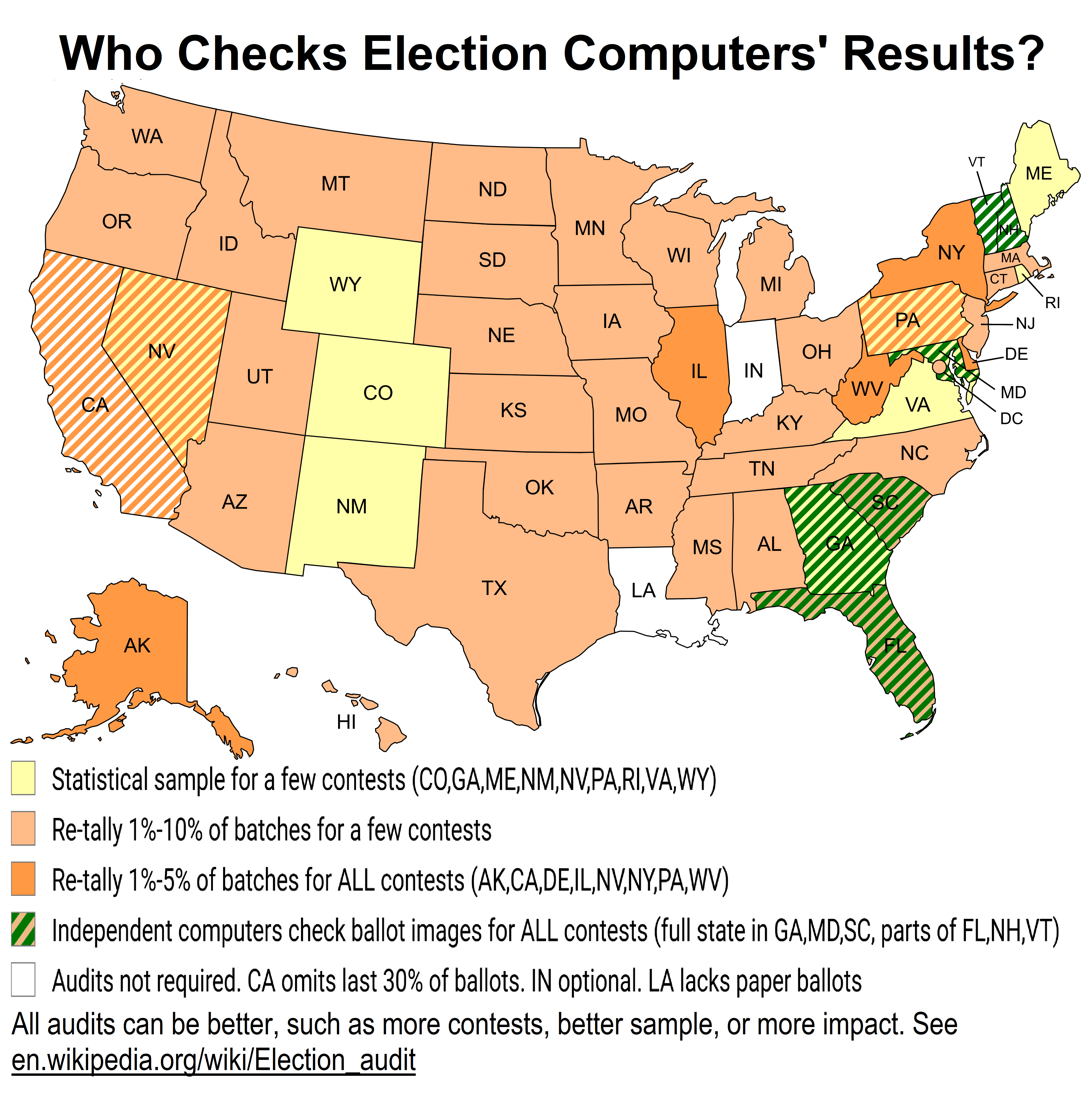
Some states check election machine counts by hand.

In an optical scan voting system, or marksense, each voter's choices are marked on one or more pieces of paper, which then go through a scanner. The scanner creates an electronic image of each ballot, interprets it, creates a tally for each candidate, and usually stores the image for later review.

The voter may mark the paper directly, usually in a specific location for each candidate, either by filling in an oval or by using a patterned stamp that can be easily detected by OCR software.

Or the voter may pick one pre-marked ballot among many, each with its own barcode or QR code corresponding to a candidate.

Or the voter may select choices on an electronic screen, which then prints the chosen names, usually with a bar code or QR code summarizing all choices, on a sheet of paper to put in the scanner. This screen and printer is called an electronic ballot marker (EBM) or ballot marking device (BMD), and voters with disabilities can communicate with it by headphones, large buttons, sip and puff, or paddles, if they cannot interact with the screen or paper directly. Typically the ballot marking device does not store or tally votes. The paper it prints is the official ballot, put into a scanning system which counts the barcodes, or the printed names can be hand-counted, as a check on the machines. Most voters do not look at the paper to ensure it reflects their choices, and when there is a mistake, an experiment found that 81% of registered voters do not report errors to poll workers.

Two companies, Hart and Clear Ballot, have scanners which count the printed names, which voters had a chance to check, rather than bar codes and QR codes, which voters are unable to check.

==== Timing of optical scans ====
The machines are faster than hand-counting, so are typically used the night after the election, to give quick results. The paper ballots and electronic memories still need to be stored, to check that the images are correct, and to be available for court challenges.

==== Errors in optical scans ====
Scanners have a row of photo-sensors which the paper passes by, and they record light and dark pixels from the ballot. A black streak results when a scratch or paper dust causes a sensor to record black continuously. A white streak can result when a sensor fails. In the right place, such lines can indicate a vote for every candidate or no votes for anyone. Some offices blow compressed air over the scanners after every 200 ballots to remove dust. Fold lines in the wrong places can also count as votes.

Software can miscount; if it miscounts drastically enough, people notice and check. Staff rarely can say who caused an error, so they do not know whether it was accidental or a hack. Errors from 2002 to 2008 were listed and analyzed by the Brennan Center in 2010. There have been numerous examples before and since.

- In a 2020 election in Baltimore, Maryland, the private company which printed ballots shifted the location of some candidates on some ballots up one line, so the scanner looked in the wrong places on the paper and reported the wrong numbers. It was caught because a popular incumbent got implausibly few votes.
- In a 2018 New York City election when the air was humid, ballots jammed in the scanner, or multiple ballots went through a scanner at once, hiding all but one.
- In a 2000 Bernalillo County (Albuquerque area), New Mexico, election, a programming error meant that straight-party votes on paper ballots were not counted for the individual candidates. The number of ballots was thus much larger than the number of votes in each contest. The software was fixed, and the ballots were re-scanned to get correct counts.
- In the 2000 Florida presidential race the most common optical scanning error was to treat as an overvote a ballot where the voter marked a candidate and wrote in the same candidate.

Researchers find security flaws in all election computers, which let voters, staff members or outsiders disrupt or change results, often without detection. Security reviews and audits are discussed in Electronic voting in the United States#Security reviews.

When a ballot marking device prints a bar code or QR code along with candidate names, the candidates are represented in the bar code or QR code as numbers, and the scanner counts those codes, not the names. If a bug or hack makes the numbering system in the ballot marking device not aligned with the numbering system in the scanner, votes will be tallied for the wrong candidates. This numbering mismatch has appeared with direct recording electronic machines (below).

Some US states check a small number of places by hand-counting or use of machines independent of the original election machines.

==== Recreated ballots ====
Recreated ballots are paper or electronic ballots created by election staff when originals cannot be counted for some reason. They usually apply to optical scan elections, not hand-counting. Reasons include tears, water damage and folds which prevent feeding through scanners. Reasons also include voters selecting candidates by circling them or other marks, when machines are only programmed to tally specific marks in front of the candidate's name. As many as 8% of ballots in an election may be recreated.

Recreating ballots is sometimes called reconstructing ballots, ballot replication, ballot remaking or ballot transcription. The term "duplicate ballot" sometimes refers to these recreated ballots, and sometimes to extra ballots erroneously given to or received from a voter.

Recreating can be done manually, or by scanners with manual review.

Because of its potential for fraud, recreation of ballots is usually done by teams of two people working together or closely observed by bipartisan teams. The security of a team process can be undermined by having one person read to the other, so only one looks at the original votes and one looks at the recreated votes, or by having the team members appointed by a single official.

When auditing an election, audits need to be done with the original ballots, not the recreated ones.

==== Cost of scanning systems ====
List prices of optical scanners in the US in 2002–2019, ranged from $5,000 to $111,000 per machine, depending primarily on speed. List prices add up to $1 to $4 initial cost per registered voter. Discounts vary, based on negotiations for each buyer, not on number of machines purchased. Annual fees often cost 5% or more per year, and sometimes over 10%. Fees for training and managing the equipment during elections are additional. Some jurisdictions lease the machines so their budgets can stay relatively constant from year to year. Researchers say that the steady flow of income from past sales, combined with barriers to entry, reduces the incentive for vendors to improve voting technology.

If most voters mark their own paper ballots and one marking device is available at each polling place for voters with disabilities, Georgia's total cost of machines and maintenance for 10 years, starting 2020, has been estimated at $12 per voter ($84 million total). Pre-printed ballots for voters to mark would cost $4 to $20 per voter ($113 million to $224 million total machines, maintenance and printing). The low estimate includes $0.40 to print each ballot, and more than enough ballots for historic turnout levels. the high estimate includes $0.55 to print each ballot, and enough ballots for every registered voter, including three ballots (of different parties) for each registered voter in primary elections with historically low turnout. The estimate is $29 per voter ($203 million total) if all voters use ballot marking devices, including $0.10 per ballot for paper.

The capital cost of machines in 2019 in Pennsylvania is $11 per voter if most voters mark their own paper ballots and a marking device is available at each polling place for voters with disabilities, compared to $23 per voter if all voters use ballot marking devices. This cost does not include printing ballots.

New York has an undated comparison of capital costs and a system where all voters use ballot marking devices costing over twice as much as a system where most do not. The authors say extra machine maintenance would exacerbate that difference, and printing cost would be comparable in both approaches. Their assumption of equal printing costs differs from the Georgia estimates of $0.40 or $0.50 to print a ballot in advance, and $0.10 to print it in a ballot marking device.

=== Direct-recording electronic counting ===
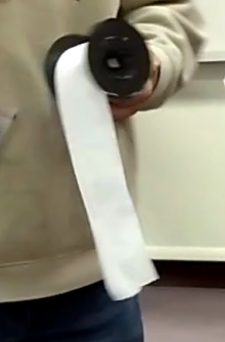
Roll of paper from direct-recording machine, with votes from numerous voters, Martinsburg, West Virginia, 2018

A touch screen displays choices to the voter, who selects choices, and can change their mind as often as needed, before casting the vote. Staff initialize each voter once on the machine, to avoid repeat voting. Voting data and ballot images are recorded in memory components, and can be copied out at the end of the election.

The system may also provide a means for communicating with a central location for reporting results and receiving updates, which is an access point for hacks and bugs to arrive.

Some of these machines also print names of chosen candidates on paper for the voter to verify. These names on paper can be used for election audits and recounts if needed. The tally of the voting data is stored in a removable memory component and in bar codes on the paper tape. The paper tape is called a Voter-verified paper audit trail (VVPAT). The VVPATs can be counted at 20–43 seconds of staff time per vote (not per ballot).

For machines without VVPAT, there is no record of individual votes to check.

==== Errors in direct-recording electronic voting ====
This approach can have software errors. It does not include scanners, so there are no scanner errors. When there is no paper record, it is hard to notice or research most errors.

- The only forensic examination which has been done of direct-recording software files was in Georgia in 2020, and found that one or more unauthorized intruders had entered the files and erased records of what it did to them. In 2014-2017 an intruder had control of the state computer in Georgia which programmed vote-counting machines for all counties. The same computer also held voter registration records. The intrusion exposed all election files in Georgia since then to compromise and malware. Public disclosure came in 2020 from a court case. Georgia did not have paper ballots to measure the amount of error in electronic tallies. The FBI studied that computer in 2017, and did not report the intrusion.
- A 2018 study of direct-recording voting machines (iVotronic) without VVPAT in South Carolina found that every election from 2010 to 2018 had some memory cards fail. The investigator also found that lists of candidates were different in the central and precinct machines, so 420 votes which were properly cast in the precinct were erroneously added to a different contest in the central official tally, and unknown numbers were added to other contests in the central official tallies. The investigator found the same had happened in 2010. There were also votes lost by garbled transmissions, which the state election commission saw but did not report as an issue. 49 machines reported that their three internal memory counts disagreed, an average of 240 errors per machine, but the machines stayed in use, and the state evaluation did not report the issue, and there were other error codes and time stamp errors.
- In a 2017 York County, Pennsylvania, election, a programming error in a county's machines without VVPAT let voters vote more than once for the same candidate. Some candidates had filed as both Democrat and Republican, so they were listed twice in races where voters could select up to three candidates, so voters could select both instances of the same name. They recounted the DRE machines' electronic records of votes and found 2,904 pairs of double votes.
- In a 2011 Fairfield Township, New Jersey, election a programming error in a machine without a VVPAT gave two candidates low counts. They collected more affidavits by voters who voted for them than the computer tally gave them, so a judge ordered a new election which they won.
- A 2007 study for the Ohio Secretary of State reported on election software from ES&S, Premier and Hart. Besides the problems it found, it noted that all "election systems rely heavily on third party software that implement interfaces to the operating systems, local databases, and devices such as optical scanners... the construction and features of this software is unknown, and may contain undisclosed vulnerabilities such trojan horses or other malware."

== General issues ==
Delayed results of vote counting can reduce public trust in the election result.

=== Interpretation, in any counting method ===
Sorting vote by mail envelopes, San Jose, Santa Clara County, California, 2018

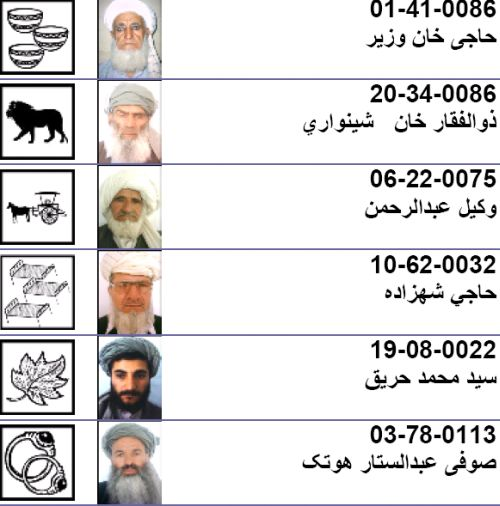
Afghan Ballot

Election officials or optical scanners decide if a ballot is valid before tallying it. Reasons why it might not be valid include: more choices selected than allowed; incorrect voter signature or details on ballots received by mail, if allowed; lack of poll worker signatures, if required; forged ballot (wrong paper, printing or security features); stray marks which could identify who cast the ballot (to earn payments); and blank ballots, though these may be counted separately as abstentions.

For paper ballots officials decide if the voter's intent is clear, since voters may mark lightly, or circle their choice, instead of marking as instructed. The ballot may be visible to observers to ensure agreement, by webcam or passing around a table, or the process may be private. In the US only Massachusetts and the District of Columbia give anyone but officials a legal right to see ballot marks during hand counting. For optical scans, the software has rules to interpret voter intent, based on the darkness of marks. Software may ignore circles around a candidate name, and paper dust or broken sensors can cause marks to appear or disappear, not where the voter intended.

Officials also check if the number of voters checked in at the polling place matches the number of ballots voted, and that the votes plus remaining unused ballots matches the number of ballots sent to the polling place. If not, they look for the extra ballots, and may report discrepancies.

=== Secure storage to enable counts in future ===
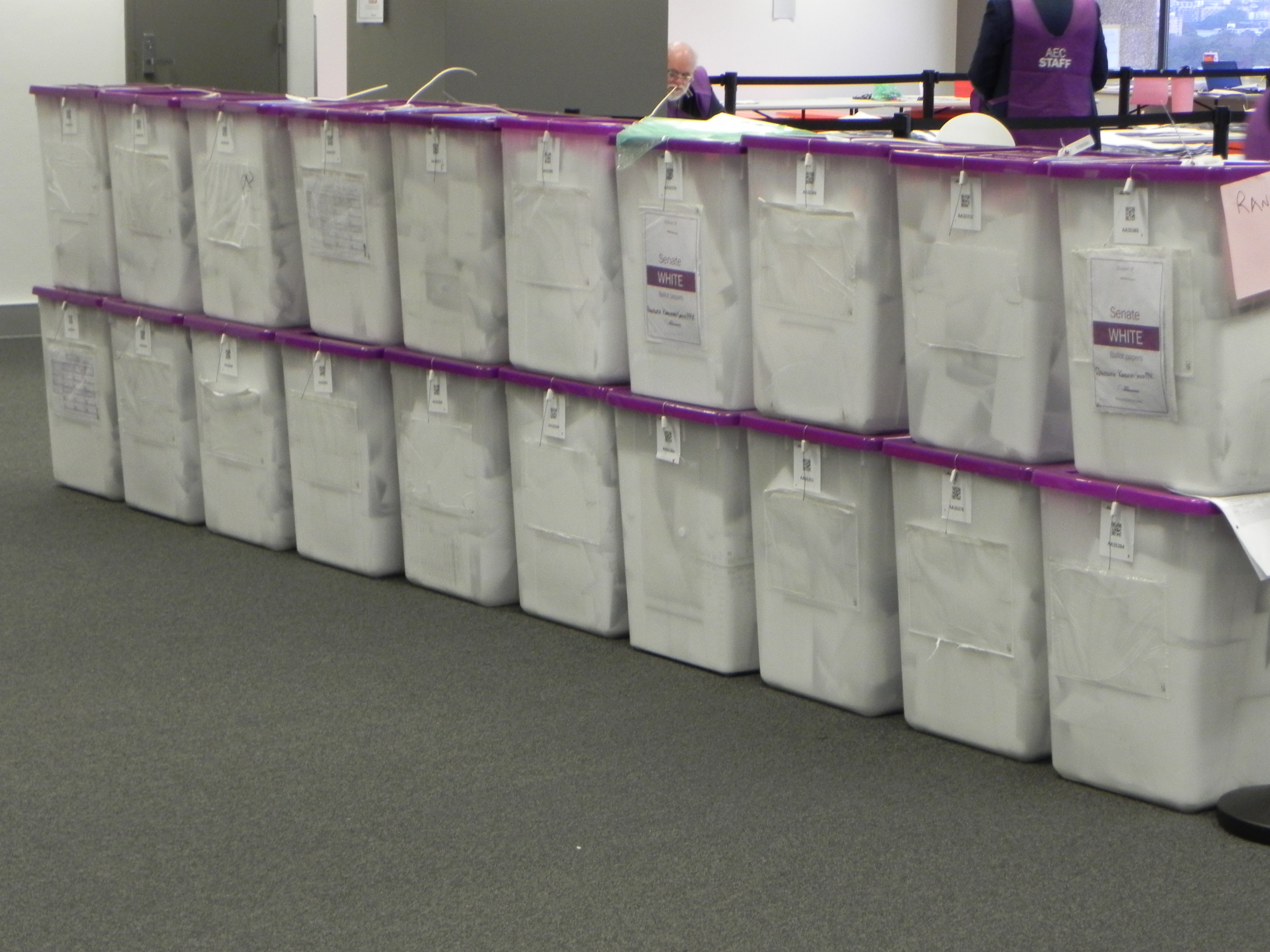
Australia-Senate-ballots-sealed

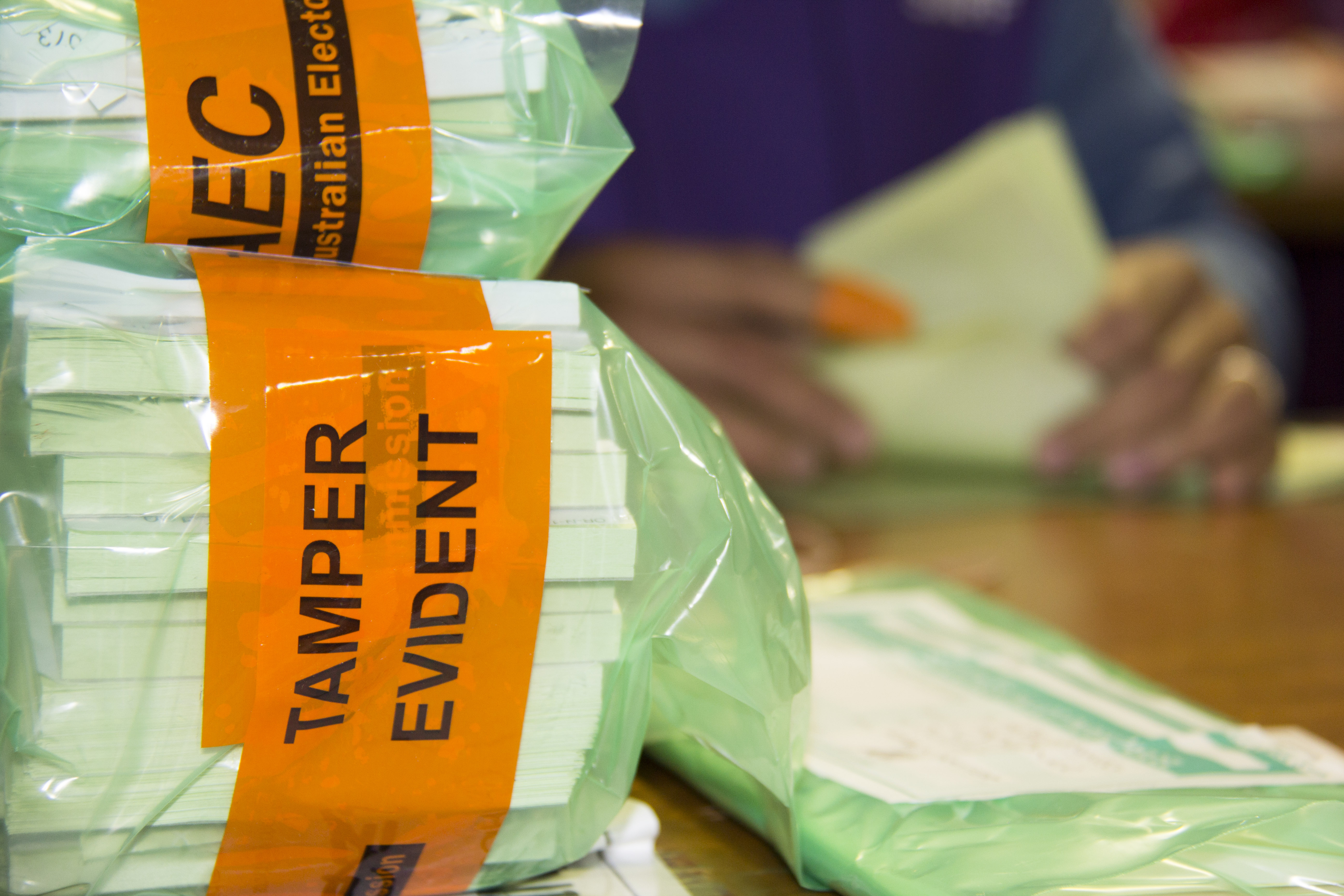
Australia-ballots-sealed

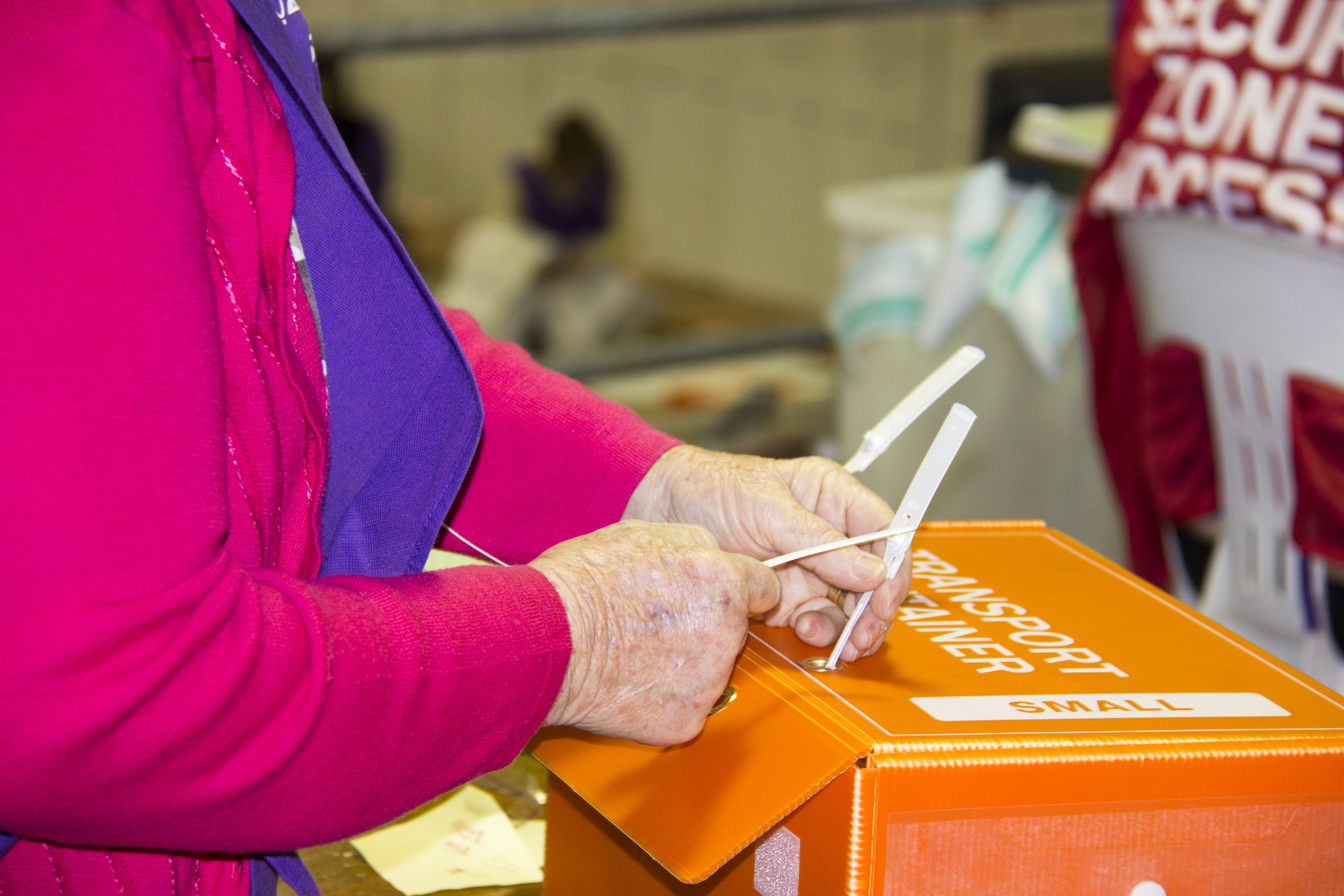
Australia-ballots-sealed

If ballots or other paper or electronic records of an election may be needed for counting or court review after a period of time, they need to be stored securely.

Election storage often uses tamper-evident seals, although seals can typically be removed and reapplied without damage, especially in the first 48 hours. Photos taken when the seal is applied can be compared to photos taken when the seal is opened. Detecting subtle tampering requires substantial training. Election officials usually take too little time to examine seals, and observers are too far away to check seal numbers, though they could compare old and new photos projected on a screen. If seal numbers and photos are kept for later comparison, these numbers and photos need their own secure storage. Seals can also be forged. Seals and locks can be cut so observers cannot trust the storage. If the storage is breached, election results cannot be checked and corrected.

Experienced testers can usually bypass all physical security systems. Locks and cameras are vulnerable before and after delivery. Guards can be bribed or blackmailed. Insider threats and the difficulty of following all security procedures are usually under-appreciated, and most organizations do not want to learn their vulnerabilities.

Security recommendations include preventing access by anyone alone, which would typically require two hard-to-pick locks, and having keys held by independent officials if such officials exist in the jurisdiction; having storage risks identified by people other than those who design or manage the system; and using background checks on staff.

No US state has adequate laws on physical security of the ballots.

Starting the tally soon after voting ends makes it feasible for independent parties to guard storage sites.

=== Secure transport and internet ===
The ballots can be carried securely to a central station for central tallying, or they can be tallied at each polling place, manually or by machine, and the results sent securely to the central elections office. Transport is often accompanied by representatives of different parties to ensure honest delivery. Colorado transmits voting records by internet from counties to the Secretary of State, with hash values also sent by internet to try to identify accurate transmissions.

Postal voting is common worldwide, though France stopped it in the 1970s because of concerns about ballot security. Voters who receive a ballot at home may also hand-deliver it or have someone else to deliver it. The voter may be forced or paid to vote a certain way, or ballots may be changed or lost during the delivery process, or delayed so they arrive too late to be counted or for signature mis-matches to be resolved.

Postal voting lowered turnout in California by 3%. It raised turnout in Oregon only in Presidential election years by 4%, turning occasional voters into regular voters, without bringing in new voters. Election offices do not mail to people who have not voted recently, and letter carriers do not deliver to recent movers they do not know, omitting mobile populations.

Some jurisdictions let ballots be sent to the election office by email, fax, internet or app. Email and fax are highly insecure. Internet so far has also been insecure, including in Switzerland, Australia, and Estonia. Apps try to verify the correct voter is using the app by name, date of birth and signature, which are widely available for most voters, so can be faked; or by name, ID and video selfie, which can be faked by loading a pre-recorded video. Apps have been particularly criticized for operating on insecure phones, and pretending to more security during transmission than they have.

== See also ==
- Recount
- Tally (voting)
- Electronic voting
- Electronic voting in Switzerland
- Voting machine
- Electoral system
- Ballot
- Election audits
- Elections
- Electoral fraud
- Electoral integrity
- List of close election results
