= December 2004 in sports =

<<	December 2004					>>
Su	Mo	Tu	We	Th	Fr	Sa
			1	2	3	4
5	6	7	8	9	10	11
12	13	14	15	16	17	18
19	20	21	22	23	24	25
26	27	28	29	30	31
Canada; Sports; United States

This list shows notable sports-related events and notable outcomes that occurred in December of 2004.

== Deaths ==
- 26 Reggie White
- 24 Johnny Oates
- 22 Doug Ault
- 18 Vijay Hazare
- 16 Ted Abernathy
- 16 Bobby Mattick
- 14 Rod Kanehl
- 13 Andre Rodgers
- 11 Arthur Lydiard
- 11 Harvey "Bum" Bright
- 10 Bob King
- 6 Raymond Goethals
- 5 Christiano Junior
- 5 Hicham Zerouali
- 4 Tom Fitzgerald

== December 31, 2004 (Friday) ==
- Cricket: Many of the world's leading cricket teams have pledged money for the humanitarian effort in South-East Asia:
  - The English cricket team have personally pledged £15,000, with the Professional Cricketers' Association adding a further £5,000
  - The Australian cricket team donated their prize money from the Melbourne test match
  - South Africa's cricket board, Cricket South Africa will make a donation, together with the sponsors of their test series against England
  - The Board of Control for Cricket in India has agreed to give Rs10million (£120,000), with the Indian cricket team donating their fees from their next One Day International
  - Bangladesh have agreed to donate the gate receipts from their forthcoming series at home against Zimbabwe, estimated to be US$10,000
  - The Federation of International Cricketers' Associations has proposed a one-day match on 11 or 12 January to raise more funds. All teams have supported the proposal, although English, South African, Bangladeshi and Zimbabwean players are likely to be unavailable because of ongoing tour commitments. The ICC is likely to endorse any such game. (Cricinfo)
- In the UK's New Year's Honours, Matthew Pinsent is knighted; Kelly Holmes and Tanni Grey-Thompson become Dames. Other Olympians and sportspeople are also recognised. (BBC)
- College football bowl games:
  - The Minnesota Golden Gophers defeat the Alabama Crimson Tide 20–16 in the Music City Bowl. (ESPN)
  - The Arizona State Sun Devils defeat the Purdue Boilermakers 27–23 in a back-and-forth matchup in the Sun Bowl. (ESPN)
  - The Louisville Cardinals defeat the Boise State Broncos 44–40 in the Liberty Bowl, ending the Broncos' 22-game winning streak. (ESPN)
  - The Miami Hurricanes defeat the Florida Gators 27–10 in the Peach Bowl. (ESPN)

== December 30, 2004 (Thursday) ==
- Cricket: South Africa hold out in the final day of the second Test against England to secure a draw, bringing to an end England's eight-game winning streak. The final score: England 139 & 570–9 dec, South Africa 332 & 290–8; bad light stops play with 15 overs remaining. England are the only team to remain unbeaten at Test cricket throughout 2004 – winning 11 times, drawing twice. (BBC)
- College football bowl games:
  - The Boston College Eagles defeat the North Carolina Tar Heels, 37–24, in the Continental Tire Bowl. (ESPN)
  - The Navy Midshipmen complete their first 10-win season since 1905 by defeating the New Mexico Lobos 34–19 in the Emerald Bowl. (ESPN)
  - The Texas Tech Red Raiders upset the Cal Golden Bears 45–31 in the Holiday Bowl. (ESPN)
  - The Northern Illinois Huskies defeat the Troy Trojans 34–21 in the Silicon Valley Football Classic. (ESPN)
- NBA:
  - The Seattle SuperSonics defeat the Atlanta Hawks, 94–79, in Atlanta. (NBA)
  - The New Jersey Nets play the Indiana Pacers, in New Jersey.
  - The Detroit Pistons play the Miami Heat, in Detroit.
  - The San Antonio Spurs play the Portland Trail Blazers, in Portland.
- Football (soccer):
  - Real Madrid announce that former Brazil coach Wanderley Luxemburgo will be their new coach, replacing Mariano Garcia Remon. Luxemburgo will be Real's third coach this season. He leaves Santos, which he recently led to the Brazilian championship. (BBC)
  - Manchester United's 19-year-old star Wayne Rooney has been given a three-match ban by the Football Association for violent behaviour after TV images showed him shoving Bolton defender Tal Ben Haim in the face. Haim has also been criticised for poor behaviour, as he was judged to exaggerate the episode. Alex Ferguson has criticised the FA for their handling of the case. (BBC)

== December 29, 2004 (Wednesday) ==
- Cricket:
  - Australia (379 and 127 for 1) beat Pakistan (341 and 163) by 9 wickets at the Melbourne Cricket Ground, Melbourne, Australia to lead the 3 test series 2–0. Ricky Ponting, the Australian captain, later suggests that Shoaib Akhtar did not bowl as well as he should have done. (Cricinfo)
  - Sri Lanka postpone their tour of New Zealand to return home. The decision is taken after a tsunami struck the eastern Sri Lankan coast, killing tens of thousands. The New Zealand Cricket Board and the International Cricket Council support the move. Muttiah Muralitharan, the second highest wicket-taker in test match history, avoided the tsunami striking Galle by minutes. The Test match ground in Galle has been devastated. (Cricinfo) (ICC)
  - Zimbabwe's arrival in Bangladesh has been postponed by two days as a result of disruption to flight schedules from India into Bangladesh caused by a tsunami striking the region. (Cricinfo)
- College football bowl games:
  - The Colorado Buffaloes defeat the UTEP Miners 33–28 in the Houston Bowl. (ESPN)
  - The Ohio State Buckeyes defeat the Oklahoma State Cowboys 33–7 in the Alamo Bowl. (ESPN)

== December 28, 2004 (Tuesday) ==
- College football bowl games:
  - The Iowa State Cyclones defeat the Miami RedHawks 17–13 in the Independence Bowl. (ESPN)
  - The Oregon State Beavers defeat the Notre Dame Fighting Irish 38–21 in the Insight Bowl. (ESPN)
- NBA:
  - Chauncey Billups scores the game-winning fade-away shot with 0.7 seconds remaining as the Detroit Pistons rally from a 17-point halftime deficit to defeat the Washington Wizards, 107–105, in the District of Columbia. (NBA)
  - The Indiana Pacers defeat the Charlotte Bobcats, 74–71, in Charlotte. Rookie Emeka Okafor records yet another double-double with 16 points and 15 rebounds, but is outplayed by Indiana's recently reinstated Jermaine O'Neal, who scores 24 and 17. (NBA)
  - The Milwaukee Bucks defeat the Orlando Magic, 111–105, in Orlando. (NBA)
  - The Houston Rockets defeat the Cleveland Cavaliers, 98–87, in Cleveland. (NBA)
  - The New York Knicks defeat the Minnesota Timberwolves, 100–87, in New York City. (NBA)
  - The Memphis Grizzlies defeat the Boston Celtics, 117–109, in Memphis. (NBA)
  - The Phoenix Suns defeat the New Orleans Hornets, 107–96, in New Orleans. Quentin Richardson completes a franchise-record 9 of 16 3-point shots, and leads the Suns in points, with 31, and rebounds, with 11. The Hornets' record falls to a league-low 2–26. (NBA)
  - The Los Angeles Clippers defeat the Utah Jazz, 101–90, in Los Angeles. (NBA)
  - The Golden State Warriors defeat the Toronto Raptors, 111–105, in Oakland. (NBA)

== December 27, 2004 (Monday) ==
- NFL
  - The St. Louis Rams beat the Philadelphia Eagles 20–7 in St. Louis. The top performers for the Rams were Marc Bulger, Steven Jackson and Isaac Bruce while on the Eagles side, the top performers were Jeff Blake, Freddie Mitchell and Dorsey Levens. (NFL)
- Cricket:
  - India (348 for 5) beat Bangladesh (257 for 9) by 91 runs in Dhaka, Bangladesh to win the third and final One Day International of the series. India win the series 2–1. (Cricinfo)
  - New Zealand's one-day cricket international against Sri Lanka scheduled on December 29 is postponed to January 11. (Jamaica Observer) (New Zealand Herald)
- Fox-hunting: Approximately 250 hunts are meeting in England and Wales for what could be the last-ever traditional Boxing Day meets. Hunting with hounds is set to become illegal in England and Wales in February. (BBC)
- College football:
  - In the MPC Computers Bowl, the Fresno State Bulldogs upset the Virginia Cavaliers 37–34 in overtime. (ESPN)
  - The UConn Huskies, making their first-ever bowl appearance, defeat the Toledo Rockets 39–10 in the Motor City Bowl. (ESPN)
- NBA:
  - The Washington Wizards defeat the Charlotte Bobcats, 106–87, in the District of Columbia. Charlotte's Emeka Okafor records his 16th consecutive double-double with 18 points and 11 rebounds, the longest such streak by a rookie in 12 years. (NBA)
  - The New York Knicks defeat the Orlando Magic, 119–111, in Orlando. (NBA)
  - The Indiana Pacers defeat the New Orleans Hornets, 100–82, in Indianapolis. The Hornets have lost 25 of 27 games so far this season. (NBA)
  - The Miami Heat defeats the Atlanta Hawks, 116–102, in Miami. (NBA)
  - The Detroit Pistons defeat the New Jersey Nets in overtime, 100–90, in Detroit. Vince Carter plays 42 minutes off the bench in his first game since being traded to the Nets, but leaves the game in progress because of a leg cramp. (NBA)
  - The Memphis Grizzlies defeat the Los Angeles Clippers, 96–76, in Memphis. (NBA)
  - The Seattle SuperSonics defeat the Utah Jazz, 98–88, in Salt Lake City. (NBA)
  - The Philadelphia 76ers defeat the Portland Trail Blazers, 111–104, in Portland. (NBA)
  - The Golden State Warriors defeat the Denver Nuggets, 104–101, in Oakland. (NBA)

== December 26, 2004 (Sunday) ==
- NFL:
  - Reggie White, who was regarded as the dominant defensive lineman in the NFL in the 1990s as a player for the Philadelphia Eagles and Green Bay Packers, dies of a heart attack at age 43. (Yahoo!)
  - Peyton Manning of the Indianapolis Colts breaks Dan Marino's 20-year record for most touchdown passes in one season with 49. Brandon Stokley catches the record-breaking and game-tying touchdown with 56 seconds left in regulation, and Mike Vanderjagt kicks a 30-yard field goal in overtime. The Colts overcome a 15-point deficit to beat the San Diego Chargers 34–31 in Indianapolis. The Colts clinch the 3rd seed in the AFC, while the Chargers will be the 4th seed. (Yahoo!)
  - The Pittsburgh Steelers clinch home-field advantage throughout the AFC playoffs with a 20–7 win over the Baltimore Ravens in Pittsburgh. (Yahoo!)
  - The New England Patriots clinch the second seed in the AFC playoffs with a 23–7 win over the New York Jets in East Rutherford, New Jersey. (Yahoo!)
  - The Seattle Seahawks guarantee themselves a playoff spot by beating the Arizona Cardinals 24–21 in Tempe, Arizona. (Yahoo!)
  - Houston Texans running back Domanick Davis runs for 150 yards and Antwan Peek returns a fumble for a touchdown in a 21–0 upset over the Jacksonville Jaguars in Jacksonville. The loss severely limits the Jaguars' playoff hopes. (Yahoo!)
  - The Buffalo Bills crush the San Francisco 49ers 41–7 behind Willis McGahee's two touchdown runs in San Francisco. The Bills, who started the season 0–4, can clinch a playoff spot next week with a win and a loss by either the Jets or Broncos. (Yahoo!)
  - The presumed game-winning touchdown pass by the Chicago Bears' Chad Hutchinson to Bernard Berrian is ruled incomplete with 1:26 left in the 4th quarter, causing the Detroit Lions to win 19–13 in Detroit. (Yahoo!)
  - With the Atlanta Falcons, already locked into the second seed in the NFC playoffs, resting injured quarterback Michael Vick, the New Orleans Saints win 26–13 in New Orleans to push themselves into playoff contention. (Yahoo!)
  - Chad Johnson catches the game-winning touchdown with 44 seconds left as the Cincinnati Bengals defeat the New York Giants 23–22 in Cincinnati. (Yahoo!)
  - Jake Delhomme throws for four touchdowns as the Carolina Panthers beat the Tampa Bay Buccaneers 37–20 in Tampa. (Yahoo!)
  - Vinny Testaverde throws a 39-yard touchdown pass to Patrick Crayton with 30 seconds left, to lead the Dallas Cowboys to a 13–10 win over the Washington Redskins in Irving, Texas. (Yahoo!)
- Cricket:
  - New Zealand (144 for 3) beat Sri Lanka (141 all out) by 7 wickets in the first One Day International at Eden Park, Auckland, New Zealand to lead the 5-match series 1–0. (Cricinfo)
  - Bangladesh (229 for 9) beat India (214 all out) by 15 runs in the second One Day International at Dhaka, Bangladesh to level the three match series 1–1. This is the first time Bangladesh have won a top-level international cricket game at home. (India Times)

== December 25, 2004 (Saturday) ==
- NFL:
  - The Denver Broncos keep their playoff hopes alive with a 37–16 victory over the Tennessee Titans in Nashville. (ESPN)
  - The Kansas City Chiefs defeat the Oakland Raiders 31–30 in Kansas City on a last second field goal by Lawrence Tynes. (Yahoo!)
  - Nick Saban, who coached the LSU Tigers to a national championship in 2003, announces he will become the new head coach of the Miami Dolphins effective in 2005. (Yahoo!)
- NBA:
  - In their first game since the brawl at The Palace of Auburn Hills, the Detroit Pistons defeat the Indiana Pacers, 98–93, in Indianapolis. (ESPN)
  - In their first matchup since the Los Angeles Lakers traded Shaquille O'Neal to the Miami Heat at least in part because of animosity with Kobe Bryant, O'Neal and the Heat defeated Bryant and the Lakers, 104–102 in overtime in Los Angeles. The Heat also extended their winning streak to 11 games, equaling a franchise record. (ESPN)

== December 24, 2004 (Friday) ==
- National Football League: The Green Bay Packers rally to defeat the Minnesota Vikings, 34–31, in Minneapolis to clinch the NFC North division. (ESPN)
- College football: The Hawaii Warriors defeat the UAB Blazers 59–40 in the Hawaii Bowl. (ESPN)

== December 23, 2004 (Thursday) ==
- College football:
  - The Wyoming Cowboys upset the UCLA Bruins, 24–21 in the Las Vegas Bowl. (ESPN)
  - The Cincinnati Bearcats defeat the Marshall Thundering Herd 32–14 in the Fort Worth Bowl. (ESPN)
  - Dave Wannstedt, who resigned his job with the Miami Dolphins in November, is named head coach of the Pittsburgh Panthers. (SI)
- Rugby union: The Rugby Football Union disqualify Zurich Premiership champions London Wasps from the Powergen Cup for fielding an ineligible player, hooker Jonny Barrett.

== December 22, 2004 (Wednesday) ==
- The IAAF has provisionally suspended the Greek sprinters Konstantinos Kenteris and Ekaterini Thanou for missing all three doping tests prior to the 2004 Summer Olympics. They could face a ban of up to two years if found guilty. (MSNBC)

== December 21, 2004 (Tuesday) ==
- Football: Dutch public broadcasting sees its rights to all major league Dutch football sold to a still to be founded commercial channel, causing a minor uproar among fans. (NOS, in Dutch)
- College football:
  - The Georgia Tech Yellow Jackets defeat the Syracuse Orange 51–14 in the Champs Sports Bowl in Orlando, Florida. (ESPN)
  - The Associated Press sends a cease-and-desist letter to the Bowl Championship Series, requesting the removal of the AP Top 25 poll from the BCS ranking formula. (AP)
- Baseball: The Los Angeles Dodgers pull out of a proposed three-way deal that would have sent Arizona Diamondbacks pitcher Randy Johnson to the New York Yankees. (ESPN)
- International basketball: Boca Juniors beats Ben Hur, 82–81, to win the 2004–2005 Argentine Top 4 Cup (Sextohombre, in Spanish)
- NBA:
  - The New Jersey Nets defeat the Charlotte Bobcats, 94–91, in Charlotte. Richard Jefferson had 28 points, 17 of which were scored in the fourth quarter.(NBA)
  - The Cleveland Cavaliers defeat the Minnesota Timberwolves, 107–97, in Cleveland. LeBron James had 26 points and 12 assists. (NBA)
  - The Dallas Mavericks defeat the New York Knicks, 123–94, in New York. (NBA)
  - The Miami Heat defeat the Boston Celtics, 108–100, in Miami. Shaquille O'Neal did not play because of a bruised left calf. The Heat are off to their best start in team history, with a 20–7 record. (NBA)
  - The Washington Wizards lose to the Sacramento Kings, 104–98, during Chris Webber's return to the Kings, in Sacramento. (NBA)
  - The New Orleans Hornets lose in overtime to the Los Angeles Clippers, 100–91, in L.A. (NBA)
- Cricket: England win their eighth successive Test, the best ever run in English cricketing history, by beating South Africa by seven wickets. (BBC)

== December 20, 2004 (Monday) ==
- National Football League:
  - In a stunning upset, the Miami Dolphins all but take away the New England Patriots' chance at home-field advantage throughout the AFC playoffs with a 29–28 win in Miami on Monday Night Football. (ESPN)
  - Philadelphia Eagles wide receiver Terrell Owens is out for the season and the NFC playoffs with a broken leg suffered in Sunday's win over the Dallas Cowboys. He may be back in time for the Super Bowl if the Eagles make it that far. (ESPN)
- NBA:
  - Despite 51 points from Allen Iverson, the Utah Jazz defeat the Philadelphia 76ers, 103–101, in Philadelphia. Kyle Korver, with 16, is the only other Sixer to score in double digits. Carlos Boozer and Mehmet Okur lead the Jazz, with a combined 48 points and 19 rebounds; Okur's free throws with 4 seconds remaining lifted the Jazz to victory. (NBA)
  - The Chicago Bulls defeat the Portland Trail Blazers, 92–87, in Chicago. Ben Gordon scores 23 points with the legendary Michael Jordan in attendance. (NBA)
  - The Houston Rockets defeat the Toronto Raptors, 114–102, in Houston. Yao Ming scores a season-high 40 points; Yao and fellow Houston superstar Tracy McGrady combine for 74 points and 22 rebounds. (NBA)
  - The Phoenix Suns defeat the Denver Nuggets, 107–105, in Denver. A Quentin Richardson tip shot at the buzzer averts overtime, and improves the Suns' record to 22–3. (NBA)
  - The Memphis Grizzlies defeat the Los Angeles Lakers, 82–72, in L.A. (NBA)
  - The Washington Wizards defeat the Golden State Warriors, 103–101, in Oakland. Gilbert Arenas won the game by making a layup shot. (NBA)
- Cricket:
  - The Turbanator, India's Harbhajan Singh, is reported by the umpires for throwing when delivering his doosra in the second test at Chittagong, Bangladesh. Reports suggest his arm bends up to 22 degrees, well outside the International Cricket Council's tolerance level. (Cricinfo)
  - India (540) beat Bangladesh (333 and 124) by an innings and 83 runs in the second test at Chittagong, Bangladesh to win the 2 match series 2–0. Man of the match is Bangladeshi Mohammad Ashraful for his 158 not out in the first innings. (Cricinfo)
- NCAA basketball:
  - A few days after accepting the position, Rick Majerus resigns as head men's basketball coach at the University of Southern California. (ESPN)
  - John Chaney coaches his 1,000th game as the Temple Owls defeat the Princeton Tigers 48–44. (ESPN)

== December 19, 2004 (Sunday) ==
- National Football League, Week 15:
  - Peyton Manning comes within one touchdown of Dan Marino's single-season record as the Indianapolis Colts defeat the Baltimore Ravens, 20–10, in Indianapolis. (ESPN)
  - The Oakland Raiders defeat the Tennessee Titans, 40–35, in Oakland. (ESPN)
  - The Jacksonville Jaguars upset the Green Bay Packers, 28–25, in Green Bay. (ESPN)
  - The Arizona Cardinals upset the St. Louis Rams, 31–7, in Tempe, Arizona. (ESPN)
  - The New Orleans Saints defeat the Tampa Bay Buccaneers, 21–17, in Tampa. (ESPN)
  - In a driving snow, the San Diego Chargers clinch the AFC West division championship by shutting out the Cleveland Browns, 21–0, in Cleveland. LaDainian Tomlinson rushed for 111 yards on 26 carries.(ESPN)
  - The Philadelphia Eagles eliminate the Dallas Cowboys from playoff contention in the NFC with a 12–7 win in Philadelphia. Eagles wide receiver Terrell Owens left the game with a swollen ankle (ESPN). The Eagles win, along with losses by the Chicago Bears, Detroit Lions, New York Giants, and the Carolina Panthers gave the Green Bay Packers a playoff berth even before their game against the Jacksonville Jaguars began. (ESPN)
  - The Houston Texans allow the fewest points in their brief history and defeat the Chicago Bears, 24–5, in Chicago. (ESPN)
  - Despite being outscored 14–7 in the fourth quarter, the Minnesota Vikings defeat the Detroit Lions, 28–27, in Detroit. The Lions botched an extra point attempt after Joey Harrington threw a touchdown to Roy Williams late in the game. (ESPN)
  - The Buffalo Bills defeat the Cincinnati Bengals, 33–17, in Cincinnati. (ESPN)
  - Chad Pennington throws for 253 yards and three touchdowns as the New York Jets defeat the Seattle Seahawks, 37–14, in East Rutherford, New Jersey. (ESPN)
  - The Kansas City Chiefs defeat the Denver Broncos, 45–17, in Kansas City. (ESPN)
- Cricket: Australia (381 and 361-5d) beat Pakistan (179 and 72) by 491 runs in the first test at the WACA in Perth, Western Australia to lead the 3 match series 1–0. Justin Langer (Aus) is made man of the match for his 191 and 97. Glenn McGrath (Aus) took a career best 8 for 24 in the second innings. (Cricinfo)
- Handball: Norway defeats Denmark, 27–25, to win the 2004 European Women's Handball Championship. (EURO 2004)

== December 18, 2004 (Saturday) ==
- Boxing:
  - Glen Johnson, former IBF world Light-Heavyweight champion, causes a mild upset by defeating the former WBC world champion, Antonio Tarver, by a twelve-round split decision in Temecula, California. Both boxers had been stripped of their world titles by the respective organizations prior to the fight, for different reasons. The fight is HBO Boxing's last telecast of 2004 (AOL)
- NBA:
  - The Charlotte Bobcats defeat the Houston Rockets in overtime, 101–100, in Charlotte. (NBA)
  - The Orlando Magic defeat the Denver Nuggets, 117–95, in Orlando. (NBA)
  - The Portland Trail Blazers defeat the Detroit Pistons, 75–74, in Detroit, as Darius Miles makes a free throw half a second left. (NBA)
  - The Boston Celtics defeat the Cleveland Cavaliers in overtime, 114–107, in Cleveland. (NBA)
  - The Chicago Bulls defeat the Indiana Pacers, 85–71, in Chicago. (NBA)
  - Allen Iverson scores a season-high 54 points as the Philadelphia 76ers defeat the Milwaukee Bucks, 116–97, in Milwaukee. (NBA)
  - The Dallas Mavericks defeat the Atlanta Hawks, 90–68, in Dallas. (NBA)
  - The San Antonio Spurs defeat the Golden State Warriors, 104–85, in San Antonio. (NBA)
  - The Phoenix Suns defeat the Washington Wizards, 110–96, in Phoenix. (NBA)
- MLB: The Oakland Athletics trade Mark Mulder to the St. Louis Cardinals in exchange for Kiko Calero, Danny Haren, and a minor league catcher. (ESPN).
- National Football League, Week 15
  - Jay Feely boots a 38-yard field goal to lead the Atlanta Falcons to a 34–31 overtime win over the Carolina Panthers in Atlanta. (ESPN)
  - The Washington Redskins defeat the San Francisco 49ers, 26–16, in San Francisco. (ESPN)
  - The Pittsburgh Steelers and rookie quarterback Ben Roethlisberger win their 12th consecutive game by defeating the New York Giants, 33–30, in East Rutherford, New Jersey. Roethlisberger threw for a career-best 316 yards while completing 18 of 28 passes. (ESPN)
- NCAA:
  - The Linfield Wildcats defeat the Mary Hardin-Baylor Crusaders 28–21 to win the NCAA Division III national football championship. (ESPN)
  - The Stanford Cardinal defeat the Minnesota Lady Gophers 3 games to 1 (30–23, 30–27, 30–21) to win the NCAA Division I women's national volleyball championship. (Stanford Athletics) (ESPN)

== December 17, 2004 (Friday) ==
- College football: The James Madison Dukes defeat the Montana Grizzlies, 31–21, to win the NCAA Division I-AA national football championship. (ESPN).
- Boxing: Ebo Elder recovers from heavy injuries sustained around his eyes, and knocks out Courtney Burton in round twelve, to retain a regional Lightweight belt, in Santa Ynez, California. The fight is the last Showtime network boxing telecast for 2004.(AOL)
  - An arrest warrant is issued against multiple times world champion Floyd Mayweather Jr., for failing to appear in court during a trial.(AOL)
- Ice hockey: The London Knights' Canadian Hockey League-record 31 game unbeaten streak ends following a 5–2 loss to the Sudbury Wolves. (TSN)
- NBA:
  - The New York Knicks defeat the Philadelphia 76ers in overtime, 113–107, in Philadelphia. (NBA)
  - The Indiana Pacers defeat the Toronto Raptors, 89–86, in Indiana. (NBA)
  - The Boston Celtics defeat the Utah Jazz, 114–106, in Boston. (NBA)
  - The Portland Trail Blazers defeat the Atlanta Hawks, 100–84, in Atlanta. (NBA)
  - The Miami Heat defeats the Denver Nuggets, 107–100, in Miami. (NBA)
  - The Memphis Grizzlies defeat the New Jersey Nets, 89–84, in Memphis. (NBA)
  - The San Antonio Spurs defeat the New Orleans Hornets, 83–67, in New Orleans. (NBA)
  - The Minnesota Timberwolves defeat the Los Angeles Clippers, 113–86, in Minnesota. (NBA)
  - The Houston Rockets defeat the Golden State Warriors, 100–83, in Houston. (NBA)
  - The Washington Wizards defeat the Los Angeles Lakers in overtime, 120–116, in L.A. (NBA)
  - The Phoenix Suns defeat the Seattle SuperSonics, 112–110, in Seattle. The Sonics and Suns have the best records in the NBA. (NBA)
  - The Toronto Raptors trade Vince Carter to the New Jersey Nets for Alonzo Mourning, Alvin Williams, Eric Williams, and two first-round draft picks. (ESPN)
- UEFA Cup: In Nyon, Switzerland, UEFA conducts the draws for the knock-out round of 16 for the UEFA Champions League, and for the knock-out rounds of 32 and 16 for the UEFA Cup:
- UEFA Champions League, Knock-out Group of 16
  - Real Madrid – Juventus
  - Porto – Inter Milan
  - Barcelona – Chelsea
  - Werder Bremen – Olympique Lyonnais
  - Liverpool – Bayer Leverkusen
  - PSV – AS Monaco
  - Manchester United – A.C. Milan
  - Bayern Munich – Arsenal
    - Games will take place over two legs, on 22–23 February 2005, and 8–9 March 2005.
- UEFA Cup, knock-out group of 32:
1. Grazer AK – Middlesbrough
2. Heerenveen – Newcastle United
3. FC Basel – Lille
4. Parma – VfB Stuttgart
5. Sporting Lisbon – Feyenoord
6. Alemannia – AZ Alkmaar
7. Austria Vienna – Athletic Bilbao
8. Partizan Belgrade – Dnipro Dnipropetrovsk
9. Valencia – Steaua Bucharest
10. Ajax – Auxerre
11. CSKA Moscow – Benfica
12. Fenerbahçe – Real Zaragoza
13. Panathinaikos – Sevilla
14. Shakhtar Donetsk – Schalke 04
15. Olympiacos – Sochaux
16. Dynamo Kyiv – Villarreal
- Games will take place over two legs, on 16–17 February and 24 February 2005.
- UEFA Cup, knock-out group of 16:
1. Winner game 1 – Winner game 5
2. Winner game 13 – Winner game 4
3. Winner game 9 – Winner game 16
4. Winner game 3 – Winner game 10
5. Winner game 15 – Winner game 2
6. Winner game 14 – Winner game 6
7. Winner game 8 – Winner game 11
8. Winner game 7 – Winner game 12
- Games will take place over two legs, on 10 March and 16–17 March 2005. (UEFA)

== December 16, 2004 (Thursday) ==
- NBA:
  - The Detroit Pistons rally from a 10-point halftime deficit to defeat the Cleveland Cavaliers 81–69 at Detroit. Detroit allows a franchise-record low 6 points in the 3rd quarter, and Cleveland star LeBron James scores a season low of only 11 points in the game. Detroit's Larry Brown records his 945th win as an NBA coach, surpassing Bill Fitch for fourth-most in history. (NBA)
  - The Chicago Bulls defeat the Milwaukee Bucks, 85–77, in Chicago. (NBA)
  - The Los Angeles Lakers defeat the Sacramento Kings, 115–99, in Sacramento. (NBA)
- Baseball:
  - The Oakland Athletics trade Tim Hudson to the Atlanta Braves in exchange for another pitcher and two outfielders. (ESPN)
  - Adrián Beltré signs a five-year US$64 million deal with the Seattle Mariners. (ESPN)
- Football (soccer): UEFA Cup Group Stage, Matchday 5
  - Group A: Hearts 0 – 1 Ferencváros
  - Group A: **FC Basel** 1 – 0 **Feyenoord**
  - Group B: Standard Liège 1 – 7 **Athletic Bilbao**
  - Group B: **Parma** 3 – 2 Beşiktaş
  - Group C: Club Brugge 1 – 1 **Real Zaragoza**
  - Group C: FC Utrecht 1 – 2 **Austria Vienna**
  - Group D: **Newcastle United** 1 – 1 **Sporting Lisbon**
  - Group D: **Sochaux** 1 – 0 Panionios
  - Teams in **bold** qualify for the knock-out round (3 from each group). In Group A Schalke 04 have already qualified. In Group B Steaua Bucharest have already qualified. In Group C Dnipro Dnipropetrovsk have already qualified. The draw for the knock-out stages of the UEFA Cup and UEFA Champions League will take place on 17 December. (UEFA.com)
- 2004 Tiger Cup, First Round
  - Myanmar 3 – 1 Timor Leste
  - Thailand 3 – 1 Philippines

== December 15, 2004 (Wednesday) ==
- NBA:
  - Carmelo Anthony makes a shot with 3.6 seconds left in the game, and Paul Pierce misses a subsequent three-point shot attempt, as the Denver Nuggets defeat the Boston Celtics, 100–99. Andre Miller of the Nuggets made a shot from the opponent's free throw line as time expired during the first quarter, but the shot was discounted because it was apparently taken after time had expired in that quarter.(NBA)
  - The defending-champion Detroit Pistons defeat the New York Knicks, 94–93, at New York, when Chauncey Billups makes two free throws with less than three seconds to go. The Pistons were down by 16 points, 56–40, at halftime. Pistons coach Larry Brown records his 944th win as a coach, tying Bill Fitch for 4th in NBA history. (NBA)
  - Dan Dickau makes a three-point shot as the third quarter is winding down and gets fouled, making the free throw for a four-point play in what would eventually be the New Orleans Hornets' first home victory of the season, a 98–89 defeat of the Golden State Warriors. The Hornets also snap an eleven-game losing streak. (NBA)
  - Steve Francis misses a three-point shot as time runs off, and the San Antonio Spurs hold on for a 94–91 win over the Orlando Magic. (NBA)
  - Jeff McInnis and Drew Gooden complete an unlikely five-point play with time running down in the third quarter (McInnis made a three-point shot, followed by a steal and a basket by Gooden) as the Cleveland Cavaliers beat the Portland Trail Blazers, 112–88. The Cavaliers extend their home winning streak to nine games, their longest home winning streak since 1993. (NBA)
- Boxing: Oscar De La Hoya announces plans to return to the Welterweight division, where he was the WBC world champion from 1997 to 1999 and in 2000. (AOL)
- Tennis: Rumors spread that former tennis star Anna Kournikova has secretly married her long-time boyfriend, Enrique Iglesias.(AOL)
- Biathlon: The men's 10 km Sprint at WC 3 in Östersund, Sweden, ends with Stian Eckhoff (NOR) getting his first World Cup race victory, and with the runner-up, teammate Frode Andresen, making his best result this season, using 10 seconds more than Eckhoff. Sergei Rozhkov (Сергей Рожков) of Russia gets the third place, 1 second after Andresen. (IBU/EBU results)
- Cross-country skiing: In the World Cup 6×1.2 km classical technique team sprint event in Asiago, Italy, the ladies' race results in an all-Nordic podium, as it is won by Norway I, (Marit Bjørgen, Ella Gjømle), one second before Finland I (Aino-Kaisa Saarinen, Virpi Kuitunen), while Sweden I (Elin Ek, Anna Dahlberg) finishes third. (FIS-Ski results) The men's race is won by Norway I (Tor Arne Hetland, Jens Arne Svartedal), finishing roughly 3 seconds before Russia I (Nikolay Pankratov, Vasily Rochev) (Николай Панкратов, Василий Рочев), who comes in 3 seconds in front of Norway II (Trond Iversen, Børre Næss). (FIS-Ski results)
- Cricket: The England and Wales Cricket Board announces new broadcasting deals with BSkyB, Five, the BBC and Talksport. From 2006 to 2009, all England home test matches and One Day Internationals, plus domestic competition coverage will be televised on Sky Sports, with highlights on Five. Test Match Special survives, as the BBC retains exclusive rights for radio coverage to home internationals, and non-exclusive rights to domestic county games. Talksport has won non-exclusive rights to radio coverage of Twenty20 games. The deals will earn English cricket £220m over 2006–09. (ECB)
- Football (soccer):
  - 2004 Tiger Cup championship, First Round
    - Group A: Thailand 3–0 Laos
    - Group A: Cambodia 0–3 Singapore
  - UEFA Cup Group Stage, Matchday 5
    - Group E: **Middlesbrough** 3–0 **Partizan Belgrade**
    - Group E: **Villarreal** 4–0 Egaleo
    - Group F: Rangers 0–2 **Auxerre**
    - Group F: **Grazer AK** 2 – 0 **AZ Alkmaar**
    - Group G: **Heerenveen** 1 – 0 Beveren
    - Group G: **VfB Stuttgart** 2 – 1 Dinamo Zagreb
    - Group H: **Lille** 1 – 0 **Sevilla**
    - Group H: AEK Athens 0 – 2 **Alemannia**
    - Teams in **bold** qualify for the knock-out round (3 from each group). In Group G Benfica have already qualified. (UEFA.com)

== December 14, 2004 (Tuesday) ==
- College football bowl game season: Southern Miss Golden Eagles defeat the North Texas Mean Green in the first bowl game of the season, the New Orleans Bowl, 31–10. (ESPN)
- Cross-country skiing: In the classical technique World Cup 1.2 km sprint event in Asiago, Italy, the ladies' race is won by Marit Bjørgen (NOR), while Finland's Virpi Kuitunen comes in second, and Ella Gjømle (NOR) gets the third place. (FIS-Ski Results) In the men's race, Jens Arne Svartedal (NOR) wins, beating teammate Tor Arne Hetland, with Björn Lind of Sweden finishing third. (FIS-Ski Results)
- Football (soccer): 2004 Tiger Cup championship, First Round
  - Group B: Philippines 2 – 1 Timor Leste
  - Group B: Malaysia 2 – 1 Thailand

== December 13, 2004 (Monday) ==
- NBA: Michael Finley of the Dallas Mavericks makes a shot with 3.2 seconds to go in regulation time, for the Mavericks to beat the Chicago Bulls, 94–93, in Dallas.(NBA)
  - The Boston Celtics defeat the Los Angeles Clippers, 134–127, in double overtime, in Los Angeles.(NBA|CELTICS)
- Ice hockey: The National Hockey League, which locked out its players almost three months ago, will formally reject a proposal put forth last week by National Hockey League Players' Association, according to a confidential league memo obtained by the Canadian sports channel TSN. (TSN)
- Cricket: India beat Bangladesh by an innings and 140 runs in the first test at Dhaka, Bangladesh to lead the 2 test series 1–0. (Cricinfo)
- Football (soccer): 2004 Tiger Cup championship, First Round
  - Group A: Singapore 6 – 2 Laos
  - Group A: Indonesia 8 – 0 Cambodia
- NFL Week 14, Monday Night Football: The Kansas City Chiefs defeat the Tennessee Titans 49–38 despite Drew Bennett's three touchdowns and 233 yards receiving, as well as quarterback Billy Volek's completing 29 of 43 passes for 426 yards. (ESPN)

== December 12, 2004 (Sunday) ==
- Rodeo: Ropers Speedy Williams and Rich Skelton win their record eighth consecutive world team roping title at the National Finals Rodeo in Las Vegas. Clay Tryan and Michael Jones won the aggregate title, while Dustin Elliott took the individual world title, his first.(AZ Central)
- College basketball: Duke University coach Mike Krzyzewski leads his team to his 700th career victory with an 82–54 win over the University of Toledo. Krzyzewski is only the 17th coach in NCAA history to lead one team to 700 wins. (ESPN)
- BBC Sports Personality of the Year Awards:
  - Sports Personality of the Year (Winner): track and field athlete Kelly Holmes
  - Sports Personality of the Year (Second place): Rower Matthew Pinsent
  - Sports Personality of the Year (Third place): Cricketer Andrew Flintoff
  - Overseas Personality of the Year: Tennis player Roger Federer
  - Unsung hero: Abdullah Ben-Kmayal
  - Coach of the Year: Arsène Wenger, manager of Arsenal F.C.
  - Team of the Year: Great Britain Olympic Men's Coxless 4 rowing team
  - Helen Rollason Award for courage in the face of adversity: Kirsty Howard
  - Lifetime Achievement: Cricketer Ian Botham
  - Young Personality of the Year: Tennis player Andrew Murray
- Biathlon: The Holmenkollen BWC event's final day features two Pursuit races, of which the ladies' 10 km race is won by Sandrine Bailly (FRA), with yesterday's winner Olga Zaitseva (Ольга Зайцева) (RUS) finishing second, and Olena Zubrilova (Олена Зубрилова) (BLR) getting the 3rd place. (IBU/EBU Results) In the men's 12.5 km race, Sven Fischer (GER) takes his 9th victory at Holmenkollen, beating Raphaël Poirée (FRA) by 8.6 seconds, and yesterday's Sprint winner, Ole Einar Bjørndalen, by 16.3 seconds. (IBU/EBU Results)
- Cross-country skiing: In the World Cup event at Fiemme Valley, Italy, Russia's #I team (Larisa Kurkina, Natalia Baranova-Masolkina, Yevgeniya Medvedeva-Arbuzova, Yuliya Chepalova) (Лариса Куркина, Наталия Баранова-Масолкина, Евгения Медведева-Абрузова, Юлия Чепалова) wins the ladies' 4×5 km Classical/Free technique relay, with Germany (Manuela Henkel, Claudia Künzel, Stefanie Böhler, Evi Sachenbacher) coming in second, and Norway (Kine Beate Bjørnås, Vibeke Skofterud, Hilde G. Pedersen, Marit Bjørgen) finishing third. (FIS-Ski Results) The men's 4×10 km C/F race is won by Norway I (Jens Arne Svartedal, Odd-Bjørn Hjelmeset, Frode Estil, Tore Ruud Hofstad), in a photo finish victory in front of Italy I (Giorgio Di Centa, Fulvio Valbusa, Pietro Piller Cottrer, Cristian Zorzi), half a second before France (Christophe Perrillat, Vincent Vittoz, Emmanuel Jonnier, Alexandre Rousselet). (FIS-Ski Results)
- Football (soccer):
  - Newell's Old Boys won its 5th Argentine League title in spite of losing 0 - 1 to Independiente.
  - A bomb warning forces the evacuation of over 70,000 people from Real Madrid's Santiago Bernabéu Stadium two minutes before the end of the La Liga match with Real Sociedad. The two teams were drawing 1–1 at the time. (BBC). The Spanish Football Association have announced that the remaining 2 minutes 40 seconds, plus 4 minutes' stoppage time, will be played at 6 p.m. on 5 January 2005. (BBC)
  - 2004 Tiger Cup championship, First Round:
    - Group B: Timor Leste 0 – 8 Thailand
    - Group B: Myanmar 1 – 0 Malaysia
  - The Indiana Hoosiers defeat the UCSB Gauchos 3–2 on penalties (they drew 1–1) to win the NCAA Division I men's soccer championship.
- National Football League, Week 14:
  - Peyton Manning comes within two touchdown passes of Dan Marino's single-season record as he leads the Indianapolis Colts to a 23–14 win over the Houston Texans and the AFC South division championship. Manning went 26 for 33 and threw for 298 yards. (ESPN)
  - Peyton's younger brother, Eli Manning, did not have as good a day as he threw for only 27 yards and completed just four of 18 passes as the New York Giants fell to the Baltimore Ravens 37–14. (ESPN)
  - Michael Vick and T. J. Duckett lead the Atlanta Falcons to the NFC South championship with a 35–10 win over the Oakland Raiders. Duckett ran for a team record four touchdowns in the game. (ESPN)
  - Jerome Bettis rushes for 57 yards and throws a 10-yard touchdown pass as the Pittsburgh Steelers defeat the New York Jets 17–6 to win the AFC North championship. (ESPN)
  - The New England Patriots clinch the AFC East division championship with a 35–28 win over the Cincinnati Bengals. (ESPN)

== December 11, 2004 (Saturday) ==
- Manny Pacquiao defeats boxer Fahsan 3K Battery of Thailand. Fahsan was knocked out with a fourth knockdown. The fight was a tune-up game to an upcoming rematch with Juan Manuel Márquez in February to unify the IBF and WBC world Featherweight titles. (PDI)
- College basketball: University of Arizona head coach Lute Olson coaches his 1,000th career victory, a 67–62 win over the University of Utah. (ESPN)
- NBA:
  - Brad Miller of the Sacramento Kings makes four straight free throws in the closing seconds, as the Sacramento Kings defeat the Indiana Pacers, 97–92, in overtime. It is the Pacers' seventh straight defeat. (NBA)
  - In a match between cross-town rivals, the Los Angeles Lakers defeat the Los Angeles Clippers, 89–87. (NBA)
- Biathlon: The second day of WC 2 at Holmenkollen, Norway, starts with the women's 7.5 km Sprint race being won by Olga Zaitseva (Cyrillic: Ольга Зайцева) (RUS), with Olga Pyleva (Cyrillics: Ольга Пылева) (RUS) and Tadeja Brankovic (SLO) tying for the 2nd place. (IBU/EBU Results) After the men's 10 km Sprint, the podium is occupied by Ole Einar Bjørndalen (NOR) at the top, Raphaël Poirée (FRA) at the next place, and Bjørndalen's teammate Halvard Hanevold at third. (IBU/EBU Results) The Sprint races' results determine the time differenced starting order of tomorrow's Pursuits.
- Boxing: Vitali Klitschko retains his WBC world Heavyweight title with an eighth-round knockout over Danny Williams, and Miguel Cotto retains his WBO world Jr. Welterweight title with a sixth-round knockout win over Randall Bailey, in Las Vegas. (AOL)
- Cricket: Indian batsman Sachin Tendulkar equals Sunil Gavaskar's world record of 34 test match centuries in the first test against Bangladesh at Dhaka. (Cricinfo)
- Cross-country skiing: Starting off the weekend's World Cup event at Fiemme Valley, Italy, Marit Bjørgen (NOR) consolidates her total WC lead by winning the ladies' 2×7.5 km Double Pursuit race. Kristina Šmigun (EST) and Gabriella Paruzzi (ITA) follow on the next two places, 0.34 and 2.57 seconds later, respectively. (FIS-Ski Results) The men's 2×15 km race is won by WC leader Axel Teichmann (GER), beating teammate Jens Filbrich and Frenchman Vincent Vittoz in a spurt where the six first skiers finish within the same second. (FIS-Ski Results)
- College football:
  - Matt Leinart, quarterback of the University of Southern California, wins the Heisman Trophy. (ESPN)
  - Valdosta State University defeats Pittsburg State University, 36–31 to win the NCAA Division II national football championship. (ESPN)
- Football: 2004 Tiger Cup championship, First Round
  - Group A: Laos 0 – 1 Cambodia
  - Group A: Vietnam 0 – 3 Indonesia

== December 10, 2004 (Friday) ==
- Ice hockey: The London Knights obtain sole possession of the Canadian Hockey League record for the longest unbeaten streak, with their 30-game run surpassing the mark set by the Brandon Wheat Kings following a rare 0–0 tie in an Ontario Hockey League game against the Guelph Storm. Guelph goaltender Adam Dennis is named first star, having stopped 48 shots from the Knights. (CP)
- Fox-hunting: The Countryside Alliance announces that 250 hunts will meet legally on 19 February, the day after fox-hunting becomes illegal in England and Wales. (BBC)
- Cricket
  - Rod Marsh steps down as director of the England and Wales Cricket Board's academy after 4 years in charge. (Cricinfo)
  - The third One Day International between Australia and New Zealand at Brisbane, Australia is called off without a ball being bowled because of rain. The 3 match series finishes level at 1–1. (Cricinfo)
  - Anil Kumble becomes India's highest wicket taker when he trapped Mohammad Rafique of Bangladesh to surpass Kapil Dev's haul of 435 wickets on the first day of their match in Dhaka.
- Football: 2004 Tiger Cup championship, First Round
  - Group B: Thailand 1 – 1 Myanmar
  - Group B: Malaysia 4 – 1 Philippines

== December 9, 2004 (Thursday) ==
- Ice hockey:
  - The Worldstars team consisting of locked-out players from North American National Hockey League starts a 7-country, 10-game charity tour against European teams, with a 4–2 win over Riga 2000 team in Riga, Latvia. (CBC)
  - The National Hockey League labor negotiations restart, after the players union, NHLPA, making the first new offer in three months. The offer includes players accepting a 24% one-time salary cut. (CBC)
- Biathlon: In the WC 2 event at Holmenkollen in Oslo, Norway, the women's 15 km Individual race is won by Martina Glagow (GER), while Svetlana Ishmouratova (Светлана Ишмуратова) (RUS) gets the 2nd place, and Magdalena Gwizdon (POL) comes in 3rd. (IBU/EBU Results) In the men's 20 km Individual contest, Sven Fischer (GER) wins (like he did in last weekend's Pursuit at Beitostølen, and like he has done seven times before at Holmenkollen), followed by Ole Einar Bjørndalen (NOR) for the next place on the podium. The third to finish is Tomasz Sikora (POL). (IBU/EBU Results)
- Football: 2004 Tiger Cup championship, First Round
  - Group A: Vietnam 9 – 1 Cambodia
  - Group A: Indonesia 0 – 0 Singapore

== December 8, 2004 (Wednesday) ==
- Cricket: Australia beat New Zealand by 17 runs at the Sydney Cricket Ground, Australia to level the 3 match One Day International series 1–1. (Cricinfo)
- Ice hockey: At his own initiative and expense, player Brendan Shanahan convenes a summit of players, management, referees and broadcasters in Toronto to discuss the rules of the game. The participants recommends several changes, mainly designed to speed up the game and increase scoring. (TSN)
- Football (soccer):
  - UEFA Champions League, Group Stage, Matchday 6
    - Group A: Deportivo 0 – 5 **AS Monaco**
    - Group A: **Liverpool** 3 – 1 Olympiacos
    - Group B: **Bayer Leverkusen** 3 – 0 Dynamo Kyiv
    - Group B: AS Roma 0 – 3 **Real Madrid**
    - Group C: Ajax 2 – 2 **Bayern Munich**
    - Group C: Maccabi Tel Aviv 1 – 1 **Juventus**
    - Group D: Fenerbahçe 3 – 0 **Manchester United**
    - Group D: **Lyon** 5 – 0 Sparta Prague
    - Teams in **bold** progress to round of 16; teams in italics go into UEFA Cup round of 32 (UEFA.com)
  - Struggling Premier League club Southampton dismiss manager Steve Wigley after just 14 games in charge of the Saints, and appoint Harry Redknapp to take his place. The appointment is certain to anger supporters of the Saints' arch-rivals Portsmouth, whose managerial post Redknapp quit just two weeks ago. (ESPN Soccernet) BBC Sport
  - In a women's international friendly, the United States defeats Mexico 5–0 at the Home Depot Center near Los Angeles. This is the final game for USA legends Mia Hamm, who assisted on two of the goals, and Julie Foudy. Joy Fawcett, also retiring, appeared at the game, but is recovering from back surgery and thus did not play. (ESPN Soccernet)
- 2004 Tiger Cup championship, First Round
  - Group B: Philippines 0 – 1 Myanmar
  - Group B: Timor Leste 0 – 5 Malaysia

== December 7, 2004 (Tuesday) ==
- UEFA Champions League football, Group Stage, Matchday 6
  - Group E: **Arsenal** 5 – 1 Rosenborg
  - Group E: Panathinaikos 4 – 1 **PSV**
  - Group F: Celtic 0 – 0 **A.C. Milan**
  - Group F: Shakhtar Donetsk 2 – 0 **Barcelona**
  - Group G: **Inter Milan** 3 – 0 Anderlecht
  - Group G: Valencia 0 – 2 **Werder Bremen**
  - Group H: **Porto** 2 – 1 **Chelsea**
  - Group H: Paris Saint-Germain 1 – 3 CSKA Moscow
  - Teams in **bold** progress to round of 16; teams in italics go into UEFA Cup round of 32 (UEFA.com)
- 2004 Tiger Cup championship, First Round
  - Group A: Vietnam 1 – 1 Singapore
  - Group A: Indonesia 6 – 0 Laos

== December 6, 2004 (Monday) ==
- Golf: Vijay Singh wins the PGA Tour Player of the Year award, ending a five-year streak held by Tiger Woods. (ESPN)
- NFL Week 13, Monday Night Football. The Dallas Cowboys become the first team in the history of MNF to come back from over ten points down at the two-minute warning and defeat the Seattle Seahawks 43–39. (ESPN)
- Netball: England beat South Africa 56–44 in Newcastle upon Tyne, England to lead their 3 test series 1–0. (BBC)

== December 5, 2004 (Sunday) ==
- Biathlon: At the last day of WC 1 at Beitostølen, Norway, the women's 4×6 km Relay is won by Russia, finishing 11 seconds before runner-up Germany, and one minute before France. (IBU/EBU Results) In the men's 4×7.5 km Relay, Norway wins by a large margin, almost one minute and a half before Germany's team, who in turn is followed 13 seconds later by Russia. (IBU/EBU Results)
- Cricket:
  - England beat Zimbabwe by 74 runs in the fourth One Day International at Bulawayo, Zimbabwe to win the 4 match series 4–0. Zimbabwe have now lost 17 games in a row.(Cricinfo)
  - New Zealand beat Australia by 4 wickets with 2 balls remaining in the first One Day International match at the Docklands (Telstra Dome) ground in Melbourne, Australia to lead the 3 match series 1–0. (Cricinfo)
- Cross-country skiing: On the final day of the week's World Cup event in Bern, Switzerland, the Ladies' 6×1.1 km free technique Team Sprint race is won by Norway I, followed closely by Germany I, and with Italy I coming in 3rd, 2.5 seconds behind the Germans. (FIS-Ski Results) In the Men's race, Russia I finishes first, 0.3 seconds ahead of Norway I, who comes in a half-second before Italy I. (FIS-Ski Results)
- NCAA football: The matchups for the four BCS bowls are announced:
  - Orange Bowl (national championship): USC vs Oklahoma.
  - Rose Bowl: Michigan vs Texas. This breaks the traditional Big 10–Pac-10 matchup.
  - Fiesta Bowl: Pittsburgh vs Utah. Utah becomes the first team from a mid-major conference to play in a BCS bowl.
  - Sugar Bowl: Virginia Tech vs Auburn. (AP)
- NFL, Week 13:
  - Jake Plummer of the Denver Broncos throws four interceptions in a 20–17 loss to the San Diego Chargers. The loss nearly assures an AFC West division title for San Diego.
  - Donovan McNabb throws five touchdown passes to lead the Philadelphia Eagles to a 47–17 win over the Green Bay Packers. Brett Favre's streak of 36 consecutive games with a touchdown pass is snapped. (AP)
  - The Cincinnati Bengals beat a winning team on the road for the first time in 14 years. Shayne Graham's last-second 24-yard field goal capped a 24-point fourth-quarter comeback as the Bengals defeat the Baltimore Ravens 27–26. (AP)
  - Peyton Manning throws three touchdown passes and Rob Morris returns a blocked field goal attempt for a touchdown as the Indianapolis Colts beat the Tennessee Titans 51–24. (AP)
  - Terrence McGee of the Buffalo Bills returns the opening kickoff 104 yards for a touchdown in a 42–32 win over the Miami Dolphins. (AP)
  - Bethel Johnson of the New England Patriots also returns an opening kickoff for the touchdown, Randall Gay returns a fumble for a score, Corey Dillon rushes for two touchdowns and Tom Brady passes for one in a 42–15 win over the Cleveland Browns. (AP)
  - The Tampa Bay Buccaneers upset the Atlanta Falcons, preventing them from clinching the NFC South title this week. Simeon Rice of the Bucs becomes just the 22nd player in NFL history to reach 100 quarterback sacks. (ESPN)
  - The Chicago Bears upset the Minnesota Vikings, 24–14. It is the first start in a Bears uniform for quarterback Chad Hutchinson. Vikings quarterback Daunte Culpepper was intercepted three times. (ESPN)
- Boxing: The WBC announces it will organize tournaments around the world, to crown one world champion in each division, from each continent. According to the release sent by WBC president José Sulaimán, this will be done as an effort to honor every continent that has had a world boxing champion.(Boxing Central)
  - Rydell Booker, a Cruiserweight contender who lost to James Toney earlier on the year, is convicted on charges of possessing cocaine.(Boxing Central)
- Field hockey: India lose 4–5 to defending champions Netherlands in their second defeat in a row in the Champions Trophy hockey tournament in Lahore, Pakistan. (Indian Express) (Deccan Herald)

== December 4, 2004 (Saturday) ==
- NBA: Former Phoenix Suns and Arizona Diamondbacks (baseball) majority owner Jerry Colangelo is diagnosed with prostate cancer.(The Arizona Republic)
  - Carmelo Anthony scores his 2,000th career point in a 104–95 Denver Nuggets victory over the Miami Heat. (ESPN)
  - Kevin Garnett ties the game with a basket with 26 seconds left in regulation, and the Minnesota Timberwolves snap a winning streak for the second night in a row, stopping the Los Angeles Clippers streak at five wins and raising their own streak to five wins in a row, with a 107–100 overtime victory.(NBA)
  - Tracy McGrady hits a shot with 26 seconds to go, giving the Houston Rockets a 77–76 win over the Philadelphia 76ers. Kyle Korver and Aaron McKie of the 76ers miss potential game winning shots as time expires. (AOL)
- Biathlon: In the WC 1 event Beitostølen, Norway, the women's 10 km Pursuit race is won by Uschi Disl (GER); her second victory at Beito in three days. Albina Akhatova (Албина Ахатова) (RUS) finishes 2nd, and Martina Glagow (GER) comes in 3rd. (IBU/EBU Results) In the men's 12.5 km Pursuit, 10 years+ BWC veteran Sven Fischer (GER) wins, followed by Nikolay Kruglov, Jr. (Николай Кругов) (RUS), who beats fellow Russian Sergei Rozhkov by a tenth of a second for the 2nd place. (IBU/EBU Results) The winner of Thursday's Sprint race for men, and thus start number one in the Pursuit, Ole Einar Bjørndalen (NOR), comes in no. 6, fronting a probably statistically unique cluster of five contestants from the same country placed contiguously on the result list. Bjørndalen loses his lead in the Biathlon World Cup to Kruglov (RUS), who has two 2nd places so far this BWC season.
- Boxing: WBC world Lightweight champion José Luis Castillo retains his title by a split and controversial decision (scores of 116–112, 117–111 and 113–115) over former two time world Jr. Lightweight champion Joel Casamayor. (Boxing Central)
- Cricket: England beat Zimbabwe by 8 wickets in the third One Day International at Bulawayo, Zimbabwe to lead the four-match series 3–0. (Cricinfo)
- Cross-country skiing: In the World Cup 2004/05's second Sprint event, in Bern, Switzerland, the 0.8 km Ladies' race is won by Norway's Marit Bjørgen, with Stefanie Böhler (GER) and Ella Gjømle (NOR) coming in second and third. (FIS-Ski Results). The 1.35 km Men's race is won by Tor Arne Hetland (NOR), with Thobias Fredriksson (SWE) and Johan Kjølstad (NOR) coming in second and third. (FIS-Ski Results)
- NCAA football:
  - The USC Trojans guarantee themselves a spot in the national championship game with a 29–24 win over the UCLA Bruins. (AP)
  - The Oklahoma Sooners, with a 42–3 rout of the Colorado Buffaloes in the Big 12 championship game, become USC's likely opponent in the Orange Bowl. (AP)
  - The Auburn Tigers win the SEC championship by beating the Tennessee Volunteers 38–28. (AP)
  - The Virginia Tech Hokies win the ACC title with a 16–10 win over the Miami Hurricanes. (AP)
  - Tyler Palko throws five touchdowns to lead his Pittsburgh Panthers to a 43–14 win over the USF Bulls, assuring Pittsburgh a share of the Big East Conference title (along with Boston College and Syracuse) and a spot in a BCS bowl. (AP)
  - In the 105th Army–Navy Game, quarterback Aaron Polanco passed for two touchdowns and scored another to lead Navy to a 42–13 win. President George W. Bush was in attendance. (AP)
  - The Capital One Bowl matchup for this year is announced: The Iowa Hawkeyes will play the LSU Tigers on January 1 in Orlando, Florida. (AP)

== December 3, 2004 (Friday) ==
- Baseball: One day after revealing Jason Giambi's admission of anabolic steroid use, the San Francisco Chronicle reports that San Francisco Giants slugger Barry Bonds had also admitted to taking designer drugs known as the cream and the clear in his grand jury testimony, but unlike Giambi, Bonds claimed he was unaware at the time that they contained steroids. (AP)
- Athletics: Victor Conte, the founder of BALCO, says during a television interview that he personally saw United States sprinter Marion Jones inject human growth hormone into her body.(AP)
- NBA: The Detroit Pistons erase a 21-point lead by the San Antonio Spurs, but the Spurs hang on for a close, 80–77 victory.
  - Corie Blount of the Boston Celtics blocks a shot by Vince Carter of the Toronto Raptors with five seconds to go, preserving the Celtics' 91–89 victory.
  - The Minnesota Timberwolves break the Phoenix Suns' eight-game winning streak, defeating them, 97–93.

== December 2, 2004 (Thursday) ==
- Baseball: The San Francisco Chronicle reports that New York Yankees first baseman Jason Giambi admitted to a grand jury that he took steroids made by BALCO. (AP) (ESPN)
- NBA: Dirk Nowitzki of the Dallas Mavericks scores 53 points in a 113–106 overtime win over the Houston Rockets. Tracy McGrady scores 49 points in a losing effort. (AP)
- Biathlon: In the opening event (WC 1) held at Beitostølen, Norway, of the 2004/05 Biathlon World Cup (BWC) season, the women's 7.5 km Sprint race is won by Uschi Disl (GER), with fellow German teammate Andrea Henkel catching the 2nd place, and Albina Akhatova (Албина Ахатова) (RUS) finishing 3rd. (IBU/EBU Results) In the men's 10 km Sprint race, Ole Einar Bjørndalen (NOR) comes into his 44th BWC victory, followed by Nikolay Kruglov, Jr. (Николай Кругов) (RUS) and Raphaël Poirée (FRA) onto the next two places on the podium. (IBU/EBU Results)
- Cricket: India beat South Africa by 8 wickets in the second test in Kolkata, India to take the 2 test series 1–0. (Cricinfo)
- Football (soccer):
  - UEFA is preparing an investigation into suspicious betting patterns related to last night's UEFA Cup group stage match between Panionios and Dinamo Tbilisi. (BBC)
  - UEFA Cup Group Stage, Matchday 4
    - Group E: **Partizan Belgrade** 1 – 1 **Villarreal**
    - Group E: Egaleo 2 – 2 Lazio
    - Group F: **AZ Alkmaar** 1 – 0 Rangers
    - Group F: Auxerre 5 – 1 Amica Wronki
    - Group G: Dinamo Zagreb 2 – 2 Heerenveen
    - Group G: Beveren 0 – 3 **Benfica**
    - Group H: **Sevilla** 3 – 2 AEK Athens
    - Group H: Alemannia 2 – 2 Zenit St. Petersburg
    - (Teams in **bold** are assured of progressing to the final round of 32 teams) (UEFA.com)
- Ice hockey: For the first time in three months, the National Hockey League agrees to meet with the National Hockey League Players' Association. The meeting will take place on December 9 in Toronto, and it is believed the NHLPA will submit a new proposal in an effort to settle the ongoing lockout. (TSN)

== December 1, 2004 (Wednesday) ==
- Football (soccer):
  - UEFA Cup group stage, Matchday 4 (UEFA.com):
    - Group A: Ferencváros 1 – 2 Basel
    - Group A: **Feyenoord** 2 – 1 **Schalke 04**
    - Group B: Athletic Bilbao 1 – 0 **Steaua Bucharest**
    - Group B: Beşiktaş 1 – 1 Standard Liège
    - Group C: Austria Vienna 1 – 1 Club Brugge
    - Group C: Real Zaragoza 2 – 1 **Dnipro**
    - Group D: Sporting Lisbon 0 – 1 Sochaux
    - Group D: Panionios 5 – 2 Dinamo Tbilisi
    - (Teams in **bold** are assured of progressing to the final round of 32 teams)
  - AFC Champions League: Al-Ittihad of Saudi Arabia wins the title, 6–3 on aggregate, over Seongnam Ilhwa Chunma of South Korea. Al-Ittihad trailed 3–1 after the first leg in Saudi Arabia, but wins 5–0 in the return leg in South Korea. (Asian Football Confederation)
