= Winning streak =

A winning streak, also known as a win streak or hot streak, is an uninterrupted sequence of success in games or competitions, commonly measured by at least three wins that are uninterrupted by losses or ties. In sports, it can be applied to teams, and individuals. In sports where teams or individuals represent groups such as countries or regions, those groups can also be said to have winning streaks if their representatives win consecutive games or competitions, even if the competitors are different. Streaks can also be applied to specific competitions: for example, a competitor who wins an event in three consecutive world championships has a winning streak at the world championships, even if they have lost other competitions during the period.

== Distinction from unbeaten streak ==
A winning streak is different from an unbeaten streak in sports where tied results are possible, and so a result is neither a win nor a loss, as in association football. Unbeaten streaks are still considered significant achievements and their length may be compared directly to winning streaks.

It is possible to achieve both an unbeaten streak and a winless streak, with an all-ties record.

== Causation ==
=== Psychological momentum ===
Most quantitative studies of winning and losing streaks, and the associated concept of psychological momentum, have failed to find any evidence that "streaks" actually exist, except as a matter of random chance. A team with low ability is more likely to lose frequently, and a team with high ability is more likely to win, but once ability is controlled for, there is no evidence that a "winning" or "losing" streak affects the result of the match. One study of European association football matches using a Monte Carlo methodology found that, once ability was accounted for, a team was actually slightly less likely to win or lose when it had experienced the same result in the previous match. A study of streaks in Major League Baseball and National Basketball Association concluded that the actual results were similar enough to predictions with no momentum effect, that the effect was of limited importance. Despite the apparent nonexistence of streaks in quantitative terms, many scholars in the field have pointed to the importance of understanding qualitative, psychological aspects of streaks. Studies in sports management suggest that some managers are able to prolong winning streaks through managerial strategies.

=== Team planning ===
In team sports, winning streaks may be achieved through planning a team based on Steiner's Taxonomy of Tasks. Teams may attempt to win through using star players (disjunctive), managing their weakest members (conjunctive), and/or aiming for squad depth (additive). Using one or a few star players, the team can suffer if the player has a bad game, or if they play a turn-taking sport such as baseball.

== Longest streaks ==
The longest (in terms of time) active winning streak in any professional sports is Spain's Antoni Bou, having won 38 consecutive FIM Trial World Championship (19 outdoor and 19 indoor) starting in 2007 and continuing through 2024 (as of March 2025, he is still active in the sport). Pakistan's Jahangir Khan's 555 consecutive wins in squash from 1981 to 1986 is also of significant note. In 2013, the Dutch wheelchair tennis player Esther Vergeer retired with an active 10-year-long winning streak of 470 matches, including a streak of 250 consecutive sets won.

== See also ==
- Losing streak
- Perfect season
- List of unbeaten football club seasons
- Bagel (tennis)
