= Norbert Kerr =

American social psychologist

- Born: December 10, 1948 (age 77); Lebanon, Missouri
- Education: Washington University in St. Louis; University of Illinois at Urbana–Champaign
- Known for: Kohler effect
- Awards: Fellow of the Society for Personality and Social Psychology since 1984; Fellow of the Association for Psychological Science since 1989
- Scientific career
- Fields: Social psychology
- Institutions: University of California, San Diego; Michigan State University; University of Kent
- Thesis: Comparative tests of several predictive models of informational social influence (1974)
- Doctoral advisor: James H. Davis

Norbert Lee Kerr (born December 10, 1948) is an American social psychologist and Emeritus Professor of Psychology at Michigan State University. As of 2014, he also held a part-time appointment as Professor of Social Psychology at the University of Kent in England. He has researched the Kohler effect and factors influencing decision-making by juries. In 1998, Kerr coined the term "HARKing" (hypothesizing after the results are known).
