= November 2004 in sports =

<<	November 2004					>>
Su	Mo	Tu	We	Th	Fr	Sa
	1	2	3	4	5	6
7	8	9	10	11	12	13
14	15	16	17	18	19	20
21	22	23	24	25	26	27
28	29	30
Sports

This list shows notable sports-related deaths, events, and outcomes that occurred in November of 2004.

== Deaths ==
- 26 Tom Haller
- 26 Bill Alley
- 17 Mikael Ljungberg
- 17 Alexander Ragulin
- 12 Mike Smith
- 9 Emlyn Hughes
- 8 Eddie Charlton
- 6 Johnny Warren
- 3 Sergei Zholtok
- 2 Gerrie Knetemann

== November 30, 2004 (Tuesday) ==
- College football: Notre Dame fires head coach Tyrone Willingham in the third year of a five-year contract. He becomes the first Notre Dame coach to be fired before the end of his contract. The leading candidate to succeed Willingham is reportedly Utah head coach Urban Meyer, a former Notre Dame assistant. (ESPN)
- NFL: Cleveland Browns head coach Butch Davis resigns after his team loses their fifth straight game. Offensive coordinator Terry Robiskie has been named interim coach. (AP)
- Rowing: Four-times Olympic gold medallist, Matthew Pinsent, announces his retirement. (BBC)
- Cricket: Australia beat New Zealand by 213 runs to win their 2 test series 2–0. (Cricinfo)

== November 29, 2004 (Monday) ==
- Baseball: Toronto Blue Jays parent company, Rogers Communications, agrees to purchase SkyDome, the Blue Jays' home stadium, from investment group Sportsco International, LP, for $25 million CAD (about $21.24 million USD). (TSN) (ESPN)
- NBA:
  - Army sergeant James R. Jordan, Jr., brother of Michael Jordan, announces he plans to stay in the military beyond the mandatory retirement after 30 years of service. (AOL news)
- Boxing: Former four-time world heavyweight champion Evander Holyfield announces that he will join ESPN2's broadcast group for at least one fight. (Boxing Central)
- College football: The Atlantic Coast Conference suspends six Clemson University football players and the Southeastern Conference the same number of players from the University of South Carolina for their part in the November 20 brawl during their game at Clemson. The suspensions will take effect on the first game of the 2005 season. (SportsTicker)
- NFL Week 12, Monday Night Football:
  - In his 200th consecutive regular-season start, Green Bay Packers quarterback Brett Favre throws for three touchdowns and 215 yards passing in a 45–17 win over the St. Louis Rams. (ESPN)

== November 28, 2004 (Sunday) ==
- Sports television: NBC Sports chairman Dick Ebersol survived a charter plane crash in Montrose County, Colorado. The pilot and co-pilot of the chartered jet died and Ebersol's son, Teddy Ebersol, was declared missing at the time of the crash. (ESPN)
- Snooker: Stephen Maguire beats David Gray in the UK Championship 10 frames to 1 (BBC)
- Cricket: England beat Zimbabwe by 5 wickets in Harare, Zimbabwe in the first One Day International to lead the 4 match series 1–0. (Cricinfo)
- Baseball: The entire Boston Red Sox team is named Sports Illustrated's Sportsmen of the Year for their 2004 World Series victory over the St. Louis Cardinals. It is the first time that an entire professional sports team was bestowed with that honor. (ESPN)
- NFL, Week 12:
  - The Cleveland Browns and Cincinnati Bengals combine for 106 points, the most in an NFL game since 1966, as the Bengals beat the Browns 58–48. (ESPN)
  - The Philadelphia Eagles clinch the NFC East division title with a 27–6 victory over the New York Giants. Eli Manning, in his second start with the Giants, throws a meager 6/21 for 148 yards with two interceptions. (ESPN)
  - The Pittsburgh Steelers extend their winning streak to 10 games with a 16–7 victory over the Washington Redskins. The streak is the team's longest since 1976. (ESPN)
  - The San Diego Chargers rally to defeat the Kansas City Chiefs, 34–31, with a game-winning field goal with less than 2:30 remaining in the game. (ESPN)
  - In a driving rain and on a muddy field, the New England Patriots defeat the Baltimore Ravens, 24–3. Corey Dillon rushed for 123 yards and a touchdown. (ESPN)
  - The Buffalo Bills upset the Seattle Seahawks, 38–9. Willis McGahee rushed for four of the Bills' five touchdowns. (ESPN)
  - In a driving snow, the Oakland Raiders defeat the Denver Broncos, 25–24 on a last-minute blocked field goal attempt. (ESPN)
- Golf: Fred Couples wins his fifth Skins Game, picking up US$640,000 from 11 skins. (ESPN)
- Cross-country skiing: In the weekend's World Cup event in Ruka-Kuusamo, Finland, Kristina Šmigun (EST) wins the Ladies' 10 km classic technique race, followed by Kateřina Neumannová (CZE) and Marit Bjørgen (NOR) at the next two places. (FIS-Ski Results) The men's 15 km race is won by Axel Teichmann (GER), with the 2nd and 3rd skiers to finish being Vasily Rochev (RUS) and René Sommerfeldt (GER), respectively. (FIS-Ski Results)
- NBA:
  - Larry Hughes ties the game making two free throws with 0.8 seconds remaining in regulation, scores a triple-double and helps his team, the Washington Wizards, beat the Toronto Raptors, 114–109, in overtime.(NBA)
  - Christian Laettner makes a free throw with 3 seconds to go, and Ricky Davis misses a shot with less than one second to go, as the Miami Heat hold off the Boston Celtics, 106–104. Paul Pierce had missed a free throw that could have tied the game with five seconds to go. (NBA)
  - The Minnesota Timberwolves stop the Sacramento Kings' winning streak at seven, defeating them 121–110 in Sacramento.(NBA)

== November 27, 2004 (Saturday) ==
- Rugby league: The 2004 Tri-Nations ends anti-climactically at Elland Road, with Australia defeating Great Britain 44–4 in the Final, having led 38–0 at half-time. It is the biggest ever defeat suffered by GB on home soil. (BBC)
- Rugby union:
  - In a pulsating game at Twickenham, the Wallabies (Australia) defeat England 21–19. (BBC)
  - The Springboks (South Africa) convincingly defeat Scotland 45–10 at Murrayfield in Edinburgh. (BBC)
  - Ronan O'Gara scores a drop goal in the 79th minute to give Ireland a 21–19 win over Argentina at Lansdowne Road. It is the second November test in which O'Gara scored all of Ireland's points. (BBC)
  - The All Blacks (New Zealand) destroy France 45–6 at Stade de France. (BBC)
- Cross-country skiing: In the weekend's World Cup event in Ruka-Kuusamo, Finland, the Men's 15 km free technique race is won by Vincent Vittoz (FRA), with the 2nd and 3rd skiers to finish being Axel Teichmann (GER) and Giorgio Di Centa (ITA), respectively. (FIS-Ski Results)
- NBA: LeBron James of the Cleveland Cavaliers, at the age of 19 years and 333 days, becomes the youngest person to reach 2,000 points in NBA history. He breaks Kobe Bryant's record, who was 20 years, 183 days old when he had his 2,000th point. The Cavaliers defeated the Chicago Bulls, 96–74. (ESPN)
- NCAA football:
  - The USC Trojans, ranked number one in the country, rout the Notre Dame Fighting Irish 41–10. USC remains a contender for the Orange Bowl national championship game, along with the Oklahoma Sooners and Auburn Tigers. (AP)
  - The Syracuse Orange spoil the Boston College Eagles' hopes of a Bowl Championship Series (BCS) berth with a 43–17 win. (AP)
  - The Boise State Broncos win their 22nd straight game and keep their slim BCS hopes alive with a 58–21 win over the Nevada Wolf Pack. (AP)
- Vanier Cup: In the lowest-scoring Vanier Cup game ever, and in the first held outside of Toronto, the Laval Rouge et Or repeat as the Canadian Interuniversity Sport football championship by defeating the Saskatchewan Huskies 7–1. (TSN)
- Boxing: Marco Antonio Barrera defeats Erik Morales by a twelve-round majority decision to conquer the WBC's world Jr. Lightweight title, Iván Calderón retains his WBO Jr. Flyweight title with a twelve-round unanimous decision over Carlos Fajardo, Óscar Larios retains his WBC world Super Bantamweight title with a twelve-round unanimous decision over Nedal Hussein, and Rafael Márquez retains his IBF world Bantamweight title, with an eighth-round knockout of former world champion Mauricio Pastrana. (AOL)

== November 26, 2004 (Friday) ==
- Rugby union: In their biggest ever winning margin, Wales defeat Japan 98–0 at the Millennium Stadium, Cardiff. (BBC)
- Cricket: England arrive in Harare, Zimbabwe for their controversial One Day International series against the Zimbabwean cricket team. (Cricinfo)
- Cross-country skiing: Starting off the 2005 World Cup season's third weekend of competitions, in Ruka-Kuusamo, Finland, the ladies' 10 km free technique distance race is won by Kateřina Neumannová (CZE), with runners-up for 2nd and 3rd place being Kristina Šmigun (EST) and Natalia Baranova-Masolkina (RUS). (FIS-Ski Results)
- NCAA football: The Nebraska Cornhuskers finish with a losing record for the first time since 1961, and without a chance to play in a bowl game for the first time since 1968, after a 26–20 loss to the Colorado Buffaloes. (AP)
- NBA:
  - Richard Hamilton of the Detroit Pistons hits a shot with 1.3 seconds left to give his team a 78–77 win over the Miami Heat. (NBA)
  - Eddie Jordan, coach of the Washington Wizards, is hospitalized with a blood clot. He will miss the next two games. (ESPN)
  - Zydrunas Ilgauskas makes a shot with 19 seconds to give the Cleveland Cavaliers a 98–96 lead over the Boston Celtics, then LeBron James blocks an attempt by Paul Pierce with less than one second to go, to preserve the Cavaliers' victory over the Celtics. (AOL)
  - Kobe Bryant scores 40 points, but Peja Stojaković makes four free throws in the game's final minute, to give the Sacramento Kings their seventh straight win, a 109–106 defeat of the Los Angeles Lakers. (NBA)
  - Allen Iverson steals a pass, then scores with two tenths of a second left, to give the Philadelphia 76ers a 116–114 victory over the Washington Wizards in overtime. (NBA)

== November 25, 2004 (Thursday) ==
- National Football League Thanksgiving Classics:
  - Indianapolis Colts quarterback Peyton Manning breaks Dan Marino's NFL record for most consecutive games with at least four touchdown passes, throwing for six in his fifth game, a 41–9 win over the Detroit Lions. (AP)
  - Dallas Cowboys rookie running back Julius Jones runs for 150 yards and two touchdowns in a 21–7 win over the Chicago Bears. (AP)
- Football: UEFA Cup Group Stage, Matchday 3
  - Group A: Schalke 04 2 – 0 Ferencváros
  - Group A: FC Basel 1 – 2 Hearts
  - Group B: Standard Liège 2 – 1 Parma
  - Group B: Steaua Bucharest 2 – 1 Beşiktaş
  - Group C: Club Brugge 1 – 0 FC Utrecht
  - Group C: Dnipro Dnipropetrovsk 1 – 0 Austria Vienna
  - Group D: Dinamo Tbilisi 0 – 4 Sporting Lisbon
  - Group D: Sochaux 0 – 4 Newcastle United
  - Group E: Lazio 2 – 2 Partizan Belgrade
  - Group E: Villarreal 2 – 0 Middlesbrough
  - Group F: Amica Wronki 1 – 3 AZ Alkmaar
  - Group F: Rangers 3 – 0 Grazer AK
  - Group G: Benfica 2 – 0 Dinamo Zagreb
  - Group G: Heerenveen 1 – 0 VfB Stuttgart
  - Group H: Zenit St. Petersburg 1 – 1 Sevilla
  - Group H: AEK Athens 1 – 2 Lille
- NBA:
  - Veteran basketball coach and television analyst Hubie Brown, who was coaching the Memphis Grizzlies, announces his retirement due to health concerns. (NBA)
  - Minnesota Timberwolves center Michael Olowokandi was arrested after police had to use a stun gun to subdue him when he refused to leave an Indianapolis nightclub. He was charged with disorderly conduct and criminal trespassing, both misdemeanors. The Timberwolves subsequently suspended Olowokandi for two games for "conduct detrimental to the team." (ESPN)
- Canadian Interuniversity Sport men's football: McMaster Marauders tailback Jesse Lumsden, who broke the CIS single season rushing record, wins the Hec Crighton Trophy as Canadian university football's most valuable player. Other CIS football awards awarded include the J. P. Metras Trophy to Concordia Stingers defensive end Troy Cunningham, the Presidents' Trophy to teammate Mickey Donovan, and the Peter Gorman Trophy to Bishop's Gaiters quarterback Kyle Williams.
- Boxing: Riddick Bowe announces that his fight with Kenny Craven, scheduled for November 28, will be cancelled due to an injury to Bowe's shoulder. (BoxingCentral)

== November 24, 2004 (Wednesday) ==
- Cricket: The English cricket team cancel their flight to Harare, Zimbabwe after Robert Mugabe's government denies visas to 13 British sports journalists who wanted to report on England's planned 5 One Day International series against the Zimbabwean team. Later, after Zimbabwe, contrary to earlier reports, gives visas to the 13, England confirm that the tour will go ahead.(Cricinfo) (BBC)
- Football (soccer):
  - Harry Redknapp resigns as manager of Portsmouth. Velimir Zajec will take temporary control of the team. (BBC)
  - Blackburn Rovers fan Jason Perryman admits a charge of racially abusing Birmingham City player Dwight Yorke at last Saturday's match. He is fined £1,000 (€1,500, $1,900) and is banned from football grounds in England and Wales for five years. (BBC)
  - UEFA Champions League, Group Stage, Matchday 5
    - Group E: PSV 1 – 1 Arsenal
    - Group E: Rosenborg 2 – 2 Panathinaikos
    - Group F: FC Barcelona 1 – 1 Celtic
    - Group F: A.C. Milan 4 – 0 Shakhtar Donetsk
    - Group G: Anderlecht 1 – 2 Valencia
    - Group G: Werder Bremen 1 – 1 Inter Milan
    - Group H: Chelsea 0 – 0 Paris Saint Germain
    - Group H: CSKA Moscow 0 – 1 F.C. Porto
- NFL: A lawyer for Miami Dolphins running back Ricky Williams announces he will serve a four-game suspension for drug abuse in December, then return to the team, ending his "retirement" announced before the season. (CNNSI)
- NBA: The Chicago Bulls avoid starting a season at 0–10 for the first time in franchise history, defeating the Utah Jazz, 101–99, to go 1–9. (NBA)
  - LeBron James scores a career-high 43 points, as the Cleveland Cavaliers deal the defending champion Detroit Pistons a 92–76 defeat, in Cleveland.(NBA)
  - The Phoenix Suns defeat the Milwaukee Bucks, 111–104, at America West Arena, to win their seventeenth game in a row at home versus the Bucks, and, for the first time in 25 years, a 10–2 record. (NBA)

== November 23, 2004 (Tuesday) ==
- Football (soccer): Sir Alex Ferguson leads Manchester United F.C. to a 2–1 victory in a Champions League match against Olympique Lyonnais – his 1000th match in charge of the team.(UEFA.com)
- Football (soccer): A week after the Spain–England international friendly at the Bernabéu was marred by racist chanting, Real Madrid's 1–1 draw with Bayer Leverkusen in the same stadium sees fans directing monkey chants and Nazi salutes at Leverkusen's Roque Junior. (BBC)
- Football (soccer): UEFA Champions League, Group Stage, Matchday 5
  - Group A: AS Monaco 1 – 0 Liverpool
  - Group A: Olympiacos 1 – 0 Deportivo La Coruña
  - Group B: Dynamo Kyiv 2 – 0 AS Roma
  - Group B: Real Madrid 1 – 1 Bayer Leverkusen
  - Group C: Bayern Munich 5 – 1 Maccabi Tel Aviv
  - Group C: Juventus 1 – 0 Ajax
  - Group D: Manchester United 2 – 1 Olympique Lyonnais
  - Group D: Sparta Prague 0 – 1 Fenerbahçe (UEFA.com)
- College football:
  - The University of Iowa announces that they have accepted an invitation to the Capital One Bowl on January 1. (ESPN)
  - Purdue University announces that they have accepted an invitation to the Sun Bowl on December 31. They will likely face either Arizona State or Oregon State. (ESPN)
- NBA:
  - The Boston Celtics place Tom Gugliotta on the injured list.
  - On the other hand, the Celtics' arch-rivals, the Los Angeles Lakers, activate veteran center Vlade Divac.
  - The Charlotte Bobcats become the first NBA expansion team since 1971 to beat a defending champion, defeating the Detroit Pistons, 91–89, at Charlotte. (NBA)
  - The Golden State Warriors beat the New Orleans Hornets, 115–109, in three overtimes.(NBA)

== November 22, 2004 (Monday) ==
- Baseball: The Montreal Expos announce that the franchise will be renamed the Washington Nationals if final approval for the team's move to the United States capital is granted. Washington Nationals was chosen over Washington Senators and Washington Grays (the latter would have been a tribute to the Homestead Grays of the Negro leagues). (AP)
- College football: Both the University of South Carolina and Clemson University, whose football teams engaged in a brawl on Saturday, announced that they would not participate in a bowl game should they be invited to one. (AP)
- Cricket: Scotland beat Canada by an innings and 84 runs in Sharjah, United Arab Emirates to win the inaugural ICC Intercontinental Cup (Cricinfo)
- NBA
  - The Utah Jazz retire John Stockton's number 12 jersey. Their celebration, however, is ruined by the New Orleans Hornets, who defeat the Jazz, 76–75. Lee Nailon scores the winning basket for the Hornets with 44 seconds left in the game. It is the Hornets' first win of the season.(NBA)
  - Kevin Garnett scores two free throws with 5 seconds to go to give his Minnesota Timberwolves a 93–92 victory over the Dallas Mavericks, who had announced hours before the game that their star player, Dirk Nowitzki, will miss seven to ten days due to an injury.(NBA)
  - Bonzi Wells lifts the Memphis Grizzlies to a 93–90 victory over the San Antonio Spurs, with a three-point shot made with 46 seconds to go in the game.(NBA)
  - The Los Angeles Clippers announce their rookie point guard, Shaun Livingston, will miss six to eight weeks of action, due a knee injury. (NBA)

== November 21, 2004 (Sunday) ==
- Cross-country skiing: In the 2005 World Cup season's second weekend of competitions, in Gällivare, Sweden, the Ladies' 4×5 km relay is won by the Norwegian No.1 team (Bjørnås, Skofterud, Pedersen, Bjørgen), with the 2nd and 3rd place going to Finland (Välimää, Kuitunen, Saarinen, Lassila) and Germany (Böhler, Sachenbacher, Reschwam Schulze, Künzel), respectively. (FIS-Ski Results) In the Men's 4×10 km relay the winners are German (Filbrich, Angerer, Sommerfeldt, Teichmann); the 2nd place goes to Italy's No.1 team (Di Centa, Valbusa, Piller Cottrer, Cristian Zorzi), and the 3rd team to finish is France (Perrillat, Vittoz, Jonnier, Chauvet). (FIS-Ski Results)
- Grey Cup: In Ottawa, The Toronto Argonauts, behind two rushing touchdowns by 41-year-old quarterback Damon Allen, defeat the BC Lions 27–19 to win the championship of the Canadian Football League. (TSN)
- NBA: The league announces suspensions resulting from the November 19, 2004 disturbance at The Palace of Auburn Hills. Ron Artest of the Indiana Pacers is suspended for the remainder of the season; teammates Stephen Jackson and Jermaine O'Neal draw 30 games and 25 games respectively. Ben Wallace of the Detroit Pistons is suspended for six games, and the Pacers' Anthony Johnson for five. Three other Pistons players and Reggie Miller of the Pacers draw one-game suspensions. (Yahoo!) (ESPN)
  - The Pistons, meanwhile, defeat the Charlotte Bobcats, 117–116 in double overtime, during their first game after the infamous incident with the Pacers. Tayshaun Prince dunked the ball with sixteen seconds to go in the second overtime, giving the Pistons the victory. (NBA)
- NFL, Week 11:
  - The year's top draft pick, quarterback Eli Manning of the New York Giants, in his first career start has one touchdown and two interceptions in a 14–10 loss to the Atlanta Falcons. (ESPN)
  - The Pittsburgh Steelers and quarterback Ben Roethlisberger rally from a 14–10 halftime deficit to defeat the Cincinnati Bengals, 19–14. (ESPN)
  - Indianapolis Colts quarterback Peyton Manning throws four touchdowns and Edgerrin James runs for 204 yards in a 41–10 win over the Chicago Bears. (Yahoo!)
  - The Buffalo Bills behind quarterback Drew Bledsoe upset the St. Louis Rams, 37–17. (ESPN)
  - The Minnesota Vikings snap a three-game losing streak with a close 22–19 victory over the Detroit Lions. Daunte Culpepper completed 22 of 32 passes for 233 yards. (ESPN)
  - Dallas Cowboys quarterback Vinny Testaverde was injured in the fourth quarter of their 30–10 loss to the Baltimore Ravens. Rookie quarterback Drew Henson fumbled on his first NFL play replacing Testaverde. (ESPN)
  - Despite being sacked six times, Quincy Carter leads the New York Jets to a 10 to 7 win over the Cleveland Browns. Jets running back Curtis Martin passes Tony Dorsett for sixth on the all-time yards rushing list. (ESPN)
- NASCAR: Kurt Busch wins the Nextel Cup Championship by a mere 8 points over Jimmie Johnson and 16 points over Jeff Gordon (NASCAR)
- Cricket: Australia beat New Zealand by an innings and 156 runs in the first test at Brisbane, Australia to lead the 2 test series 1–0 (Cricinfo)
- Kabaddi: India win the first-ever World Cup kabaddi championship defeating Iran in the final held at Mumbai (Indian Express) (The Hindu)

== November 20, 2004 (Saturday) ==
- Cross-country skiing: In the 2005 World Cup season's second weekend of competitions, in Gällivare, Sweden, the Ladies' 10 km classic style race is won by Marit Bjørgen (NOR), with Kristina Šmigun (EST) and Virpi Kuitunen (FIN) coming in second and third. (FIS-Ski Results). In the Men's 15 km race, Axel Teichmann (GER) wins, followed by René Sommerfeldt (GER) and Vasily Rochev (RUS). (FIS-Ski Results)
- NBA: Commissioner David Stern suspends Ron Artest, Stephen Jackson, and Jermaine O'Neal of the Indiana Pacers and Ben Wallace of the Detroit Pistons indefinitely for their parts in the November 19, 2004 disturbance at The Palace of Auburn Hills. (NBA) (ESPN)
  - The Houston Rockets beat the Los Angeles Clippers, 91–86, in overtime.(NBA)
- Rugby union:
  - England convincingly defeats the South African Springboks 32–16 at Twickenham in London. (BBC)
  - Argentina defeats France 24–14 at Stade Vélodrome in Marseille. This is the first loss ever for France in Marseille. (BBC)
  - The All Blacks (New Zealand) win a hard-fought match with Wales 26–25 at Millennium Stadium in Cardiff. (BBC)
  - The Wallabies (Australia) defeat Scotland 31–17 at Hampden Park in Glasgow. (BBC)
- Rugby league: Great Britain defeats the New Zealand Kiwis 26–24 in the final group match of the Rugby League Tri-Nations at KC Stadium in Hull. The Great Britain team will face the Australia Kangaroos in the Tri-Nations final next week. (BBC)
- NCAA football:
  - The California Golden Bears rout the Stanford Cardinal 41–6 in the Big Game to retain control of the Stanford Axe for the third year in a row. (SI)
  - The Ohio State Buckeyes upset the Michigan Wolverines 37–21, but Michigan wins the championship of the Big Ten Conference and a berth in the Rose Bowl due to the Iowa Hawkeyes' 30–7 win over the Wisconsin Badgers. (Yahoo!) (Yahoo!)
  - The Utah Utes, by virtue of a 52–21 win over the BYU Cougars, go undefeated for the first time since 1930, giving them a chance to become the first team from a "mid-major" conference to earn a spot in the Bowl Championship Series. (Yahoo!)
  - A brawl breaks out in a game between the University of South Carolina and Clemson University, marring longtime USC coach Lou Holtz's final game. Clemson wins 29–7. (Yahoo!)
- Canadian Interuniversity Sport football: The Saskatchewan Huskies defeat the Saint Mary's Huskies 31–16 in the Mitchell Bowl, while the Laval Rouge et Or defeat the Laurier Golden Hawks 30–11 in the Uteck Bowl. Saskatchewan will face Laval for the Vanier Cup. (TSN) (TSN)
- Boxing:
  - "Winky Wright" retains his world Jr. Middleweight title with a 12-round majority decision over Shane Mosley in their rematch. (BoxingCentral)
  - During the Wright-Mosley rematch, Oscar De La Hoya announces that he has signed his conqueror, Bernard Hopkins, to de la Hoya's promotional company, "Golden Boy Promotions". (BoxingCentral)

== November 19, 2004 (Friday) ==
- NBA: With less than a minute to go in a game between the Indiana Pacers and the Detroit Pistons at The Palace of Auburn Hills in suburban Detroit, an on-court altercation (a.k.a. "The Auburn Hills Incident", etc.) between the teams over a foul degenerates into a massive brawl as Pacers players assault heckling Pistons fans. Several announcers call it the worst fight in recent basketball history. The game is called off, with the Pacers winning by default, 97–82. Numerous fines and player suspensions are expected. (AP) (NBA) (ABC) (Seattle Post-Intelligencer)

== November 18, 2004 (Thursday) ==
- College football: Lou Holtz announces he will retire as head football coach at the University of South Carolina at the conclusion of the 2004 season, paving the way for Steve Spurrier to replace him. (ESPN)

== November 17, 2004 (Wednesday) ==
- Football (soccer): Across the globe, 40 matches in World Cup 2006 qualifying: FIFAWorldCup.com
  - 15 matches in Asia, the last day of Round 2.
    - Japan 1–0 (1–0) Singapore
    - Uzbekistan 6–1 (5–0) Chinese Taipei
    - Korea Republic 2–0 (0–0) Maldives
    - Thailand 1–1 (0–0) Yemen
    - Indonesia 3–1 (1–1) Turkmenistan
    - Kuwait 6–1 (1–1) Malaysia
    - China PR 7–0 (3–0) Hong Kong
      - Kuwait and China each finish with 5 wins and 1 loss. Kuwait scored 15 and allowed 2, China scored 14 and allowed 1. Each had a +13 goal differential, and Kuwait advances on goals scored. After the disappointing "loss", China coach Arie Haan announces his resignation.
    - Oman 0–0 India
    - UAE 1–0 (0–0) Korea DPR
    - Bahrain 4–0 (3–0) Tajikistan
    - Syria 0–1 (0–0) Kyrgyzstan
    - Iran 7–0 (3–0) Laos
      - Ali Daei's four goals make him the first male player to score 100 goals in international play; with 102 in his career, he trails four women, among them Mia Hamm and Michelle Akers.
    - Qatar 2–0 Jordan
    - Lebanon 0–0 Vietnam
    - Saudi Arabia 3–0 Sri Lanka
    - Bahrain, Iran, Japan, Korea DPR, Korea Republic, Kuwait, Saudi Arabia and Uzbekistan will compete in the semifinal stage. They will be drawn into two groups of four teams each on December 9.
  - One make-up game in Africa: Kenya 2–1 (1–1) Guinea
  - 13 matches in Europe.
    - Armenia 1–1 (0–1) Romania
    - Russia 4–0 (3–0) Estonia
    - Macedonia FYR 0–2 (0–0) Czech Republic
    - Cyprus 1–2 (1–1) Israel
    - Georgia 2–2 (1–1) Denmark
    - Liechtenstein 1–3 (1–1) Latvia
    - Turkey 0–3 (0–2) Ukraine
    - Malta 0–2 (0–1) Hungary
    - Luxembourg 0–5 (0–2) Portugal
    - Belgium 0–2 (0–1) Serbia and Montenegro
    - Greece 3–1 (2–0) Kazakhstan
    - San Marino 0–1 (0–1) Lithuania
    - Andorra 0–3 (0–2) Netherlands
  - 5 matches in South America, the 11th matchday of 18.
    - Ecuador 1–0 (0–0) Brazil
    - Colombia 1–0 (1–0) Bolivia
    - Uruguay 1–0 (0–0) Paraguay
    - Argentina 3–2 (2–1) Venezuela
    - Peru 2–1 (0–0) Chile
  - 6 matches in CONCACAF, the last day of semifinal play.
    - Trinidad and Tobago 2–1 (0–0) St. Vincent / Grenadines
    - Honduras 0–0 Costa Rica
    - Panama 3–0 (3–0) El Salvador
    - United States 1–1 (1–1) Jamaica
    - Guatemala 0–1 (0–0) Canada
    - Mexico 8–0 (2–0) St. Kitts and Nevis
    - Costa Rica, Guatemala, Mexico, Panama, Trinidad and Tobago, and United States will play in the final group, starting February 9, 2005
  - In an international friendly at the Bernabéu in Madrid, Spain defeats England 1–0. The match, however, is marred by racist chants aimed at black England players, especially Ashley Cole and Shaun Wright-Phillips. (BBC – match report) (BBC – reaction to racism)

== November 16, 2004 (Tuesday) ==
- Football (soccer): Iraq 4 – 1 Palestine in a 2006 World Cup qualifying match; each team has already been eliminated from contention.
- Baseball: Anaheim Angels right fielder Vladimir Guerrero is named Most Valuable Player in the American League. (ESPN)
- Miscellaneous: David Holmes wins the second season of Dream Job, ESPN's talent search show, over Grant Thompson to become the next anchor of SportsCenter, the network's flagship sports news show. Akron Beacon Journal

== November 15, 2004 (Monday) ==
- Formula One: Energy drink company Red Bull acquire Jaguar Racing to form Red Bull Racing
- Cricket: Saurav Ganguly ICC stops the suspension of him for the two tests being played with South Africa in coming days
- Baseball: Barry Bonds wins his fourth consecutive National League Most Valuable Player award; this is also Bonds' seventh award overall. (ESPN)
- Canadian Football League: Police in Regina, Saskatchewan investigate incidents at the home of Saskatchewan Roughriders kicker Paul McCallum in the hours following the Roughriders' loss to the BC Lions. Outraged fans are alleged to have vandalized McCallum's home with eggs and manure, and uttered death threats. The club and Regina's mayor both denounce the vandalism as an "isolated incident" of "hooliganism." One man is reported to have been charged, with more arrests expected. (CBC)

== November 14, 2004 (Sunday) ==
- Canadian Football League:
  - The BC Lions clinch a spot in the Grey Cup by beating the Saskatchewan Roughriders 27–25 in overtime in the Western Division Final. After Saskatchewan's Paul McCallum missed an 18-yard field goal earlier in overtime (scoring a rouge), Duncan O'Mahony's 40-yard field goal proved to be the winning score. (TSN)
  - The Toronto Argonauts, thanks to the two touchdowns from Arland Bruce, defeat the Montreal Alouettes 26–18 in the Eastern Division Final, earning the other berth in the Grey Cup. It will be only the second time in the history of the Grey Cup that the BC Lions take on the Argos. (TSN)
- National Football League Week 10:
  - The Chicago Bears defeat the Tennessee Titans 19–17 in only the second game in NFL history to end on a safety in overtime. Titans quarterback Billy Volek was sacked in the end zone for the win. (Yahoo!)
  - Jacksonville Jaguars quarterback David Garrard, making only his second career start, throws a 36-yard touchdown to Jimmy Smith in overtime to beat the Detroit Lions 23–17. Eddie Drummond of the Lions returned two punts for touchdowns. (Yahoo!)
  - Joey Porter of the Pittsburgh Steelers and William Green of the Cleveland Browns are ejected after an altercation prior to their game in Pittsburgh. The Steelers won 24–10 on two touchdowns and 103 yards rushing by Jerome Bettis. (Yahoo!)
  - The Baltimore Ravens come back from 14 points down to beat the New York Jets 20–17 in overtime. The Ravens' Ed Reed had a 100-yard interception return for the second consecutive week, but it was shortened on a penalty. (Yahoo!)
  - Indianapolis Colts quarterback Peyton Manning throws five touchdowns for the third time this season in a 49–14 rout of the Houston Texans. (Yahoo!)
  - The Green Bay Packers defeat the Minnesota Vikings, 34–31 on a last-second field goal by Ryan Longwell. The Vikings were down by as many as 14 points before coming back to tie the game in the fourth quarter. (ESPN)
- Football (soccer): Alecko Eskandarian scores two goals as D.C. United defeats the Kansas City Wizards 3–2 to take the 2004 Major League Soccer championship, the franchise's fourth title. (ESPN)
- Baseball: Omar Vizquel becomes the first of the new free agents to join a new team, signing a three-year, US$12.25 million contract with the San Francisco Giants. The Gold Glove-winning shortstop wanted to return to the Cleveland Indians for a 12th season, but the Indians declined to pick up Vizquel's $5 million option for 2005. (ESPN)

== November 13, 2004 (Saturday) ==
- Football (soccer): In a CONCACAF World Cup qualifying match previously postponed due to weather, Mexico defeats St. Kitts and Nevis 5–0.
- Rugby union:
  - Ireland defeats the Springboks (South Africa) 17–12 at Lansdowne Road in Dublin. (BBC)
  - A mostly experimental All Blacks (New Zealand) side smashes Italy 59–10 in Rome. (BBC)
  - France defeats the Australian Wallabies 27–14 at Stade de France in suburban Paris. (BBC)
- Rugby League Tri-Nations: Great Britain defeat the Kangaroos 24–12 at the JJB Stadium in Wigan. It is the first time the Lions have beaten Australia since 2001, and the first time since 1992 that the winning margin has been higher than 11 points.
- Boxing: Madison Square Garden Heavyweights undercard: (BoxingCentral)
  - John Ruiz recovers from two knockdowns and one point reduction to retain his WBA world Heavyweight title with a twelve-round unanimous decision over Andrzej Gołota. His manager, Norman Stone, has an altercation with the referee and also punches Gołota's trainer after round one.
  - Chris Byrd also recovers from a knockdown, to retain his IBF world Heavyweight title with a twelve-round split decision over Jameel McCline.
  - Experienced Larry Donald defeats former world Cruiserweight and Heavyweight champion Evander Holyfield with a twelve-round unanimous decision.
  - Former world Heavyweight champion Hasim Rahman sco-res a fourth round knockout victory over former WBO world title challenger Kali Meehan.

== November 12, 2004 (Friday) ==
- Ice hockey: Forbes magazine issues a report that is in concurrence with the NHLPA's contention that the NHL's financial data which they used to justify imposing an ongoing lockout on the players is not accurate. Forbes claims the league actually lost $96 million in 2003–04 and $123 million 2002–03, less than half the $224 million and $273 million losses reported for those respective seasons by the league. The NHL claims Forbes' report to be "factually inaccurate", while the union points to Forbes' reputation.
- NBA: The NBA and Alburra TV, a satellite television network shown in 22 Middle Eastern countries, announce a new contract agreement that would expand NBA television coverage to the Middle East. (NBA)
  - Kyle Korver of the Philadelphia 76ers scores a three-point shot with three seconds to go in regulation time, forcing the game to go into an overtime, and then, Allen Iverson scores a game winning basket with one second to go, as the 76ers defeat the Indiana Pacers, 106–104.
  - The San Antonio Spurs defeat the Miami Heat, 93–84, in coach Gregg Popovich's 400th career win.
  - The Atlanta Hawks defeat the New Orleans Hornets, 96–95, as Antoine Walker hits his 1,000th NBA career three-point shot, and the Hawks earn their first win of the season.
  - Antonio Daniels scores a basket with seven seconds to go, to give the Seattle SuperSonics an 88–87 win over the Toronto Raptors.

== November 11, 2004 (Thursday) ==
- Major League Baseball: Minnesota Twins pitcher Johan Santana is unanimously selected as the American League Cy Young Award winner. Curt Schilling of the Boston Red Sox finished second with 27 second-place votes. (ESPN)

== November 10, 2004 (Wednesday) ==
- Major League Baseball: Atlanta Braves manager Bobby Cox was named Manager of the Year in the National League and Texas Rangers manager Buck Showalter was named Manager of the Year in the American League, narrowly edging out the Minnesota Twins' Ron Gardenhire. (ESPN)
- Football (soccer): UEFA approves the use of artificial turf in competitions sanctioned by the European governing body starting next season. The sport's rule-making body, the IFAB earlier this year had approved the use of artificial surfaces that met standards set by the world governing body, FIFA. (Yahoo!/AP)
- NBA:
  - The Boston Celtics defeat the Portland Trail Blazers, 90–88, with a last-second basket by Paul Pierce, who sustained an eye injury during the game. Gary Payton scored 15 points in the game, and passed the 20,000 career point mark. (ESPN)
  - Allen Iverson hits a shot to tie the game at 96–96 with six seconds to go in regulation time, and the Philadelphia 76ers proceed to beat the New Jersey Nets, 108–100, in overtime. (ESPN)
  - Center Zydrunas Ilgauskas makes a three-point shot with three seconds to go, tying the game at 99–99 and sending the Cleveland Cavaliers to overtime, eventually leading to the Cavaliers' 114–109 victory over the Phoenix Suns.(AOL)

== November 9, 2004 (Tuesday) ==
- Major League Baseball: Houston Astros pitcher Roger Clemens wins the National League Cy Young Award in his first year in the National League. He had previously won the honor a record six times in the American League. Clemens becomes the oldest player ever to win the award (at 42) and the fourth player to win in both leagues. (ESPN)
- NFL: Miami Dolphins head coach Dave Wannstedt resigned after the Dolphins began the season with an NFL-worst 1–8 record. Defensive coordinator Jim Bates will be named interim coach. The Dolphins have struggled all season, beginning with the unexpected preseason retirement of star running back Ricky Williams. Wannstedt finished the 2003 season with a 10–6 record. (ESPN)

== November 8, 2004 (Monday) ==
- NHL:
  - The Hockey Hall of Fame inducts defencemen Raymond Bourque, Paul Coffey and Larry Murphy. (ESPN)
  - Former St. Louis Blues forward Mike Danton is sentenced to 7½ years in prison for trying to have his agent killed. Danton asked that he serve his sentence in his native Canada. (ESPN)
- Major League Baseball: MLB Rookie of the Year award winners are announced. Oakland Athletics shortstop Bobby Crosby wins for the American League and Jason Bay of the Pittsburgh Pirates wins in the National League. (ESPN)
- NBA:
  - The Dallas Mavericks defeat the Golden State Warriors, 101–98, in overtime. (ESPN)
  - The Detroit Pistons, defending NBA champions, defeat the Los Angeles Clippers, 99–96, in double over time. Richard Hamilton had tied the game at 85 with six seconds left in regulation to send the game into the first overtime. Ben Wallace then tied it at 89 apiece with 20 seconds to go, to send the game into the second overtime. Chauncey Billups delivered the game deciding free throws with nine seconds to go in the second overtime. (ESPN)
  - The Utah Jazz score 100 points for the fourth time this season and improve their record to 4–0 with a 102–91 win over the Denver Nuggets. (ESPN)
- NFL:
  - Week 9, Monday Night Football: Mike Vanderjagt's 35-yard field goal gives the Indianapolis Colts a 31–28 win over the Minnesota Vikings. During the game, Marvin Harrison received a reception from Peyton Manning for the 664th time, breaking the record of most completions by a quarterback–wide receiver duo in NFL history previously held by the Buffalo Bills' tandem of Jim Kelly and Andre Reed. (ESPN)
  - The NFL announces an extension of its television contracts with CBS and Fox until 2011. The league will now have the right to move more intriguing late-season matchups to Monday night, and start a new package of Thursday or Saturday night games late in the season. The league is still negotiating with its two other television partners, ABC and ESPN.(CNNSI/AP)

== November 7, 2004 (Sunday) ==
- New York City Marathon: South African Hendrik Ramaala wins the men's marathon with a time of 2 hours, 9 minutes and 28 seconds. In the women's marathon, Paula Radcliffe of Great Britain came in first with a near-record time of 2 hours, 23 minutes and 10 seconds. (Canada.com) (Yahoo!/Reuters) (San Francisco Chronicle)
- National Football League Week 9:
  - The Pittsburgh Steelers hand the Philadelphia Eagles their first loss of the season, 27–3. Jerome Bettis, usually only used near the goal line this season, runs for 149 yards. (Yahoo!/AP)
  - New England Patriots kicker Adam Vinatieri throws his first career touchdown pass in a 40–22 win over the St. Louis Rams. (Yahoo!/AP)
  - The Buffalo Bills upset the New York Jets 22–17 on a career-high 132-yard rushing performance from Willis McGahee. (Yahoo!/AP)
  - Quarterback Jake Plummer throws for four touchdowns as the Denver Broncos defeat the Houston Texans 31–13. (Yahoo!/AP)
  - The Arizona Cardinals end a 17-game road losing streak with a last-minute 24–23 win over the Miami Dolphins. (Yahoo!/AP)
  - The New York Giants commit five turnovers in an upset 28–21 loss to the Chicago Bears. (Yahoo!/AP)
  - Baltimore Ravens safety Ed Reed returns an interception for 106 yards – the longest in league history – as the Ravens defeat the Cleveland Browns 27 to 13. (Yahoo!/AP)
- NBA:
  - Vince Carter makes a three-point shot with three seconds to go in the game, breaking a 95–95 tie and eventually helping the Toronto Raptors beat the Portland Trail Blazers, 101–97.

== November 6, 2004 (Saturday) ==
- Rugby union:
  - The Wallabies (Australia) defeat Scotland 31–14 at Murrayfield in Edinburgh. (BBC)
  - The Springboks (South Africa) defeat Wales 38–36 at Millennium Stadium in Cardiff. (BBC)
- Rugby league:
  - In the Rugby League Tri-Nations, Great Britain defeats New Zealand 22–12 at Galpharm Stadium in Huddersfield, England. (BBC)
- Boxing:
  - Kostya Tszyu retains his world Jr. Welterweight championship with a third-round knockout over Sharmba Mitchell. Joan Guzmán, Yori Boy Campas, Jermaine Woods and Jonathan Ochoa also win their fights, held at the Glendale Arena, in Glendale, Arizona (see:Kostya Tszyu vs. Sharmba Mitchell II) (Boxing Central)
- NBA
  - The Charlotte Bobcats register their first franchise win in history, with a 111–100 defeat of the Orlando Magic.
  - The Houston Rockets beat the Sacramento Kings, 104–101, in overtime.
  - The Phoenix Suns defeat the New Jersey Nets, 102–80, to register their first 3–0 start in twenty years.

== November 5, 2004 (Friday) ==
- Football (soccer): Tottenham Hotspur manager Jacques Santini resigns for personal reasons after only 13 matches in charge.
- Baseball: Three days after they hired Wally Backman as their manager, the Arizona Diamondbacks fire him and hire Bob Melvin. The Diamondbacks had conducted a belated background check which confirmed the factual accuracy of an article published in the New York Times on November 2, which stated that Backman had relatively recent criminal convictions for drunk driving and misdemeanor harassment, as well as financial problems. (ESPN)
- NBA:
  - The New Jersey Nets defeat the Chicago Bulls, 111–106, in two overtimes.

== November 4, 2004 (Thursday) ==
- Football (soccer): UEFA Cup Group Stage, Matchday 2
  - Group A: Hearts 0 – 1 Schalke 04
  - Group A: Ferencváros 1 – 1 Feyenoord
  - Group B: Parma 1 – 0 Steaua Bucharest
  - Group B: Beşiktaş 3 – 1 Athletic Bilbao
  - Group C: FC Utrecht 1 – 2 Dnipro Dnipropetrovsk
  - Group C: Austria Vienna 1 – 0 Real Zaragoza
  - Group D: Newcastle United 2 – 0 Dinamo Tbilisi
  - Group D: Sporting Lisbon 4 – 1 Panionios
  - Group E: Partizan Belgrade 4 – 0 Egaleo
  - Group E: Middlesbrough 2 – 0 Lazio
  - Group F: Grazer AK 3 – 1 Amica Wronki
  - Group F: AZ Alkmaar 2 – 0 Auxerre
  - Group G: VfB Stuttgart 3 – 0 Benfica
  - Group G: Dinamo Zagreb 6 – 1 Beveren
  - Group H: Lille 2 – 1 Zenit St. Petersburg
  - Group H: Sevilla 2 – 0 Alemannia (UEFA.com)
- Baseball:
  - The New York Mets name Willie Randolph as their new manager. (ESPN)
  - The Philadelphia Phillies name Charlie Manuel as their new manager. (ESPN)
- NBA:
  - The Charlotte Bobcats play their first game in franchise history, losing to the Washington Wizards, 104–95.
  - The Denver Nuggets defeat the Minnesota Timberwolves, 94–92, in overtime.

== November 3, 2004 (Wednesday) ==
- Major League Baseball: The National League winners of the Gold Glove are announced.
  - Pitcher: Greg Maddux (Chicago Cubs)
  - Catcher: Mike Matheny (St. Louis Cardinals)
  - First Base: Todd Helton (Colorado Rockies)
  - Second Base: Luis Castillo (Florida Marlins)
  - Third Base: Scott Rolen (St. Louis Cardinals)
  - Shortstop: César Izturis (Los Angeles Dodgers)
  - Outfield: Jim Edmonds (St. Louis Cardinals), Andruw Jones (Atlanta Braves), Steve Finley (Arizona Diamondbacks/Los Angeles Dodgers) (ESPN)
- Football (soccer): UEFA Champions League, Group Stage, Matchday 4 (UEFA.com)
  - Group A: Deportivo La Coruña 0 – 1 Liverpool
  - Group A: Olympiacos 1 – 0 AS Monaco
  - Group B: Dynamo Kyiv 2 – 2 Real Madrid
  - Group B: AS Roma 1 – 1 Bayer Leverkusen
  - Group C: Bayern Munich 0 – 1 Juventus
  - Group C: Maccabi Tel Aviv 2 – 1 Ajax
  - Group D: Olympique Lyonnais 4 – 2 Fenerbahçe
  - Group D: Manchester United 4 – 1 Sparta Prague (UEFA.com)
- National Hockey League:
  - The NHL announced that due to the current lockout, the 2005 All-Star Game, that was slated to be held on February 13, 2005, will be cancelled. (ESPN)
  - Former NHL player Sergei Zholtok, playing with Riga in Latvia during the lockout, walks out of a game in Belarus but collapses and dies before leaving the building. Zholtok had been previously diagnosed with cardiac arrhythmia. (TSN)
- NBA:
  - The Orlando Magic beat the Milwaukee Bucks 93–92, with a basket by Steve Francis with 0.2 seconds remaining in the game.
  - The Indiana Pacers beat the Cleveland Cavaliers, 109–104, in two overtimes.
  - The Los Angeles Clippers score their most lopsided opening night victory ever, defeating the Seattle SuperSonics, 114–84.

== November 2, 2004 (Tuesday) ==
- Major League Baseball: The American League winners of the Gold Glove are announced.
  - Pitcher: Kenny Rogers (Texas Rangers)
  - Catcher: Iván Rodríguez (Detroit Tigers)
  - First Base: Darin Erstad (Anaheim Angels)
  - Second Base: Bret Boone (Seattle Mariners)
  - Shortstop: Derek Jeter (New York Yankees)
  - Third Base: Eric Chavez (Oakland Athletics)
  - Outfield: Ichiro Suzuki (Seattle Mariners), Torii Hunter (Minnesota Twins), Vernon Wells (Toronto Blue Jays)
- Horse Racing: Melbourne Cup run in Melbourne, Australia. Makybe Diva wins back-to-back; 2nd: Vinnie Roe; 3rd: Zazzman; last: She's Archie
- Football (soccer): UEFA Champions League, Group Stage, Matchday 4
  - Group E: Arsenal 1 – 1 Panathinaikos
  - Group E: PSV 1 – 0 Rosenborg
  - Group F: FC Barcelona 2 – 1 A.C. Milan
  - Group F: Celtic 1 – 0 Shakhtar Donetsk
  - Group G: Werder Bremen 5 – 1 Anderlecht
  - Group G: Inter Milan 0 – 0 Valencia
  - Group H: CSKA Moscow 0 – 1 Chelsea
  - Group H: F.C. Porto 0 – 0 Paris Saint Germain

== November 1, 2004 (Monday) ==
- Major League Baseball: The Arizona Diamondbacks named former New York Met Wally Backman as their new manager.
- NBA basketball:
  - The Phoenix Suns decide to keep Yuta Tabuse as the last man on their regular season roster. Thus, Tabuse becomes the first Japanese born player ever to participate in an NBA season. (NBA/Suns)
  - The Houston Rockets sign Tracy McGrady to a multi-year contract extension. His current contract will net him US$47.1m over the next three years, while the contract extension is worth US$85.7m for the following four years. The contract extension will keep McGrady in a Rockets uniform until the 2010–11 season. (NBA/Rockets)
  - The Portland Trail Blazers announce the signing of Zach Randolph to a multi-year contract extension. (NBA/Trailblazers)
  - The Chicago Bulls waive forward Eddie Robinson, who had been signed by the team with great expectations, but whose career was hampered by injuries sustained in a car accident. (NBA/Bulls)
- Football (soccer): Berti Vogts resigns as manager of the Scotland national football team.
- NFL Week 8, Monday Night Football: The New York Jets improve to 6–1 in a 41–14 rout of the Miami Dolphins. (ESPN)
- Boxing:
  - Venezuelan boxer Juan Jose Landaeta officially files a protest at the WBA's Caracas offices, for the result of his fight the previous week against WBA world minimumweight champion, Yutaka Niida, where Landaeta lost a split decision in Japan. Landaeta hopes the WBA can revert the decision.
