= Steiner's Taxonomy of Tasks =

Task taxonomy

In his book Group Processes and Productivity, Ivan Dale Steiner identified a taxonomy of group tasks to be a key source of coordination problems in groups, contributing to process losses within those groups.

These tasks are divided into three categories: Component (or divisibility), Focus (quantity or quality), and Interdependence (combinatorial strategies), with an overlap of tasks between categories.

== Component ==
The Component category looks at whether or not a group's task has subcomponents that can be clearly identified and individually assigned to specific members of the group.

=== Divisible ===
Divisible tasks can be divided into subtasks and individual members can be assigned specific subtasks to be completed in contribution to the greater task. For example, a group of students assigned a test to complete together as a group, can divide the questions among the individual students to be completed based on specific areas of expertise.

=== Unitary ===
Unitary tasks cannot be divided into subtasks which require the group to either work together on the one task or have only one individual complete the task with the remainder of the group becoming bystanders. For example, if the test assigned to a group of students to complete together consisted of only one question that could not be broken into smaller questions, the group would be required to work together to discuss and determine the correct answer or one student would answer the question with the others not participating.

== Focus ==
The Focus category considers whether the focus of the task is on quantity or on quality. Which is more important for the group – how much is produced or how good is the product.

=== Maximizing ===
A maximizing task is focused on quantity so that the greater quantum produced, the better the outcome. Using the example of a group of students assigned to complete a test together were advised that it was time limited and marks were awarded for partial answers, the group would be focused on providing some portion of an answer to as many questions as possible.

=== Optimizing ===
An optimizing task is focused on quality, seeking a correct or optimal solution. For example, if the group of students assigned to complete a test together were advised that marks would be deducted for incorrect or incomplete answers, the focus would be on the quality of the individual answers.

== Interdependence ==
The Interdependence category contains five task types that Steiner describes as combinatorial strategies illustrating how the individual contributions of members of a group can be combined in different ways.

=== Additive ===
Additive tasks allow members to each contribute individually and those individual contributions then add together for the greater output of the group. Additive tasks are also categorized as divisible and having a maximizing focus. They require adding together the individual contributions of group members to maximize the outcome of the group. Examples provided in Forysth's summary of Steiner's work include shovelling snow and pulling a rope (tug of war).

=== Compensatory ===
Compensatory tasks require group members to average their individual recommendations or solutions. Examples provided in Forsyth's summary of Steiner's work include estimating the weight of an animal or averaging a job applicant's ratings.

=== Disjunctive ===
Disjunctive tasks require group members to determine a single solution for the entire group. Disjunctive tasks are also categorized as unitary and optimizing (in contrast to additive tasks). Examples provided in Forsyth's summary of Steiner's work include picking one person's answer to a math problem to be the group's answer and letting one art project represent the entire school.

=== Conjunctive ===
Conjunctive tasks are tasks requiring all group members to contribute to complete the product. In this type of task the group's performance is determined by the most inferior or weakest group member. Examples provided in Forysth's summary of Steiner's work include climbing a mountain and eating a meal as a group.

=== Discretionary ===
Discretionary tasks allow members of the group to determine which way they will use and/or combine individual contributions. Examples provided in Forysth's summary of Steiner's work include choosing to vote on the best answer to a problem or to rely on the expertise of one group member to provide the group answer.
