= Conjunctive tasks =

Conjunctive tasks are a part of Steiner's taxonomy of group tasks. Conjunctive tasks can be completed only with the effort and contribution of all group members. Conjunctive tasks are not finished until all members of the group have completed their portion of the task.

Conjunctive tasks are often studied when dealing with process losses in groups. Process loss is observed in groups when there is a reduction in their performance effectiveness or efficiency. This could be due to a variety of interpersonal processes, which may be caused by either motivation loss or coordination loss. Conjunctive tasks fall into the latter category of coordination problems in groups.

== The Most Inferior Group Member (IGM) ==
Conjunctive tasks are tasks where all group members must contribute to the end product in order for it to be completed. On most tasks, a group's performance is the result of a combination of everyone's effort; however, with conjunctive tasks, the group's overall performance depends on the most inferior group member (IGM). Colloquially this person is often termed the "weakest link."

Conjunctive tasks are not complete until the entire group has completed their portion of the job. Consequently, the speed and quality of the work is dependent on the least skilled member of the group. In this way, this group member is like the rate determining step. It would be to the benefit of the group to assign the easiest subtask to such a member. Conversely, if they are matched with the most difficult and complex subtasks, the group's overall performance will further suffer.

== Productivity Dependence on Divisibility of Task ==
Conjunctive tasks can differ in their productivity effect depending on whether they are unitary or divisible. If a task is conjunctive and unitary, then the same task must be completed by all members and cannot be split into smaller parts. For these tasks, the group performance will be “equal to the worst”, where the overall group performance will equal the performance of the least capable group member.

If a task is conjunctive and divisible, the task can be split amongst group members, but each portion must be completed before the entire task can be successful. In this case, the group performance is “better than the worst,” such that the group performance will be superior, as long as members are appropriately matched to subtasks that suit their abilities. The weakest members of the group should be given the easiest subtasks and the most capable members should be given the more difficult subtasks, if productivity is to be maximized.

== The Kohler Effect ==
No one wants to be the weakest link of any group. As a result, weaker individuals in the group respond to this by expending more effort than they would had they been working alone. This is known as the Kohler effect, where performance gains are seen in weaker individuals who are striving to keep up with the accomplishments of other group members.

The effect is named after Otto Kohler, who discovered in 1926 that weaker members of the group would strive to keep up with the accomplishments of others in that group, leading to greater performance of these weaker members. Individuals who perform inferior work compared to someone else show improvement relative to those deprived of this comparison. Moreover, this gain is even more marked when they are part of a group working on a conjunctive task. A recent meta-analysis of related studies has confirmed the presence of the Köhler effect, and has noted that it seems to be stronger in women than men

The Kohler effect is seen more when IGMs are involved in face-to-face groups. There is also more improvement from IGMs when information is readily available concerning the performance quality of others. While continuous feedback is not necessary to produce the effect, the removal of all feedback eliminates the Kohler effect, such that one does not know whether they are the IGM or not. Delaying or restricting feedback to after the task is complete, and no more than identifying the superior or inferior member, reduces the effect but does not eliminate it. The greater presence of the Kohler effect in conjunctive tasks than additive or co-action suggests that the instrumentality of completing the task or subtask is more likely driving the effect than social comparison processes.

== Applications of the Kohler Effect ==
The Kohler Effect has been studied and applied to many different areas, including extensive application to athletics and group exercise. The Kohler effect has been demonstrated in swimming and track and field athletes, such that inferior group members showed the greatest motivational gains compared to their more highly performing teammates. Inferior athletes showed the greatest performance gains between preliminary and final races. Weaker athletes also showed more performance improvement when going from individual to group competition than did middle-ranked or higher-ranked teammates.

Exercise with a partner can increase motivation, persistence, and therefore performance when the subject is paired with a superior workout partner, including if that partner is virtually present. While any type of grouping tends to improve exercise motivation, several studies show that conjunctive pairings lead to the greatest performance improvement. For example, time spent on a stationary bike is recorded based on the first partner to drop out, rather than having partners simply cycling beside each other (coactive). This has been shown with exercise games, aerobic activity, and competitive races. Differences in partner age and weight do not appear to influence the Kohler effect.
