= Sportradar =

Swiss multinational sports data services company

Sportradar AG
- Formerly: Market Monitor AS
- Type: Public
- Traded as: Nasdaq: SRAD
- Industry: Sports betting; Sports entertainment; Sports data
- Founded: 2001; 25 years ago, in Trondheim, Norway
- Founders: Petter Fornæss; Tore Steinkjer; Carsten Koerl
- Headquarters: St. Gallen, Switzerland
- Number of locations: 29 offices in 20 countries (2024)
- Key people: Carsten Koerl (group CEO); Craig Felenstein (CFO)
- Brands: Betradar
- Services: Advertising digital services; Audio visual distribution; Sports results and statistics; Managed trading services; OTT streaming; Odds monitoring and suggestions; Integrity services
- Revenue: ▲€1.29 billion (2025)
- Net income: ▲€100 million (2025)
- Number of employees: 3,900 (2024)
- Subsidiaries: MOCAP Analytics; Optima Group; Sportradar US; Laola1
- Website: sportradar.com

Sportradar AG is a Switzerland-based sports technology company. The company provides sports data services for national and international sports federations, media outlets, and bookmakers. It also provides streaming media services to several federations and leagues, as well as sports integrity services.

The company is headquartered in St. Gallen, Switzerland; as of 2024 it has 29 offices in 20 countries, including New York City, Las Vegas, London, Trondheim, Munich, Warsaw, Wrocław, Vienna, Ljubljana, Sydney, Montevideo, and Singapore.

== History ==
Sportradar started as a software program that extracted betting odds from sports betting companies on the Internet. The program was developed by two Norwegians, Petter Fornass and Tore Steinkjer, who formed the company Market Monitor AS in 2001. Carsten Koerl was a major investor, buying 51% of the company's stock.

In 2012, Sportradar merged with Kilka. That same year, private equity firm EQT invested in Sportradar. In 2013, Sportradar made several acquisitions, including Attainment GmbH and Venatrack Ltd. In December 2023, Sportradar acquired the U.S. based sports data firm SportsData.

In September 2014, Sportradar became a 40% shareholder of NSoft, a software company from Bosnia and Herzegovina that offers an omnichannel betting solution for betting and gambling operators. That same year, EQT's Expansion Capital Fund II reinvested in Sportradar by selling its minority stake in the company to its flagship fund, EQT VI.

In 2015, Sportradar obtained distribution rights for NASCAR, the NFL, and the NHL. The same year, Revolution LLC led investments in the company from Michael Jordan and Mark Cuban. The NFL also acquired equity in Sportradar US as part of the partnership. At the end of 2015, Sportradar renewed the partnership with the International Tennis Federation as their official data collection service partner.

In 2016, Sportradar acquired Sportman Media Holding, including Laola1. Later that year, the NBA announced a multi-year partnership with Sportradar involving integrity services, data distribution and video streaming.

In January 2021, the company announced that former Fiserv CEO Jeff Yabuki as Sportradar's new chairman. In March 2021, Bloomberg News reported that Sportradar was in talks to go public via a SPAC, Horizon Acquisition Corp II. Sportradar held an initial public offering on the U.S.-based Nasdaq on 14 September 2021, at a valuation of US$8 billion.

In June 2021, the NHL announced a 10-year agreement with Sportradar to serve as its official betting data and streaming rights, media data rights, and integrity partner. The agreement expanded upon one first established in 2015. In April 2022, the league invoked an option in the agreement to make a US$10 million equity investment in Sportradar.

== Sports betting services ==
Through the brand Betradar, Sportradar provides bookmakers with several sports-betting services.

As of 2015, Sportradar has partnered with roughly 450 bookmakers including Bet365, William Hill, Paddy Power, and Ladbrokes. The Sportradar services are also used by state lotteries such as Veikkaus, Svenska Spel and Norsk Tipping.

Sportradar creates odds for thousands of games across 40 sports. The odds are created by feeding sports data collected by Sportradar into mathematical models. For in-game betting odds, this requires continuous recalculation of the outcomes using the live data that Sportradar collects or acquires through licenses. These odds are sold as odds suggestions to bookmakers, for matches for which the bookmakers are unable to create their own odds.

Sportradar will also use its integrity services to monitor betting on all NFL games and will have the right to distribute live audio-visual feeds of NFL games to sportsbooks in certain international markets.

== Audio-visual, OTT, and broadcast services ==
In 2016, Sportradar agreed to a deal to acquire the shares and core business of media agency Sportsman Media Group.

They have worked with the K League, World Rally Championship, and Borussia Dortmund, to deliver their OTT platforms. In the 2022–23 NHL season, Sportradar took over operations of the league's international OTT service NHL.tv.

The K League signed a multi-year deal with Sportradar in late 2019, to extend its international broadcasting. This resulted in coverage reaching a record number of territories during the 2020 season.

== Integrity services ==
Sportradar provides federations and law enforcement agencies with a system for detecting betting-related match fixing. These services are operated by Sportradar's Security Services division.

Initial services included an Early Warning System developed in 2005 following the Hoyzer scandal. The use of this system was one of the measures Bundesliga took for preventing further match-fixing. Later versions included live monitoring, and was relaunched in 2009 as Fraud Detection System (FDS).

The development of FDS was done in cooperation with UEFA. Through this partnership, Sportradar monitors suspicious matches in the two top leagues of every UEFA member nation.

FDS has since then expanded its partnerships to other sports and federations, including Asian Football Confederation, CONCACAF, FIBA, ESL and IOC. Sportradar has also signed agreements with several law enforcement agencies, including Europol and the Australian Federal Police.

The Fraud Detection System works by comparing odds movement patterns from online bookmakers with the expected odds' movement patterns for a given match. When suspicious matches are found, they are analyzed and then reported to the relevant federation. The federation can then start their own investigations. As of 2016, the Fraud Detection System monitors more than 31,000 European football matches per year.

Since the launch of the Fraud Detection System, Sportradar has been involved in several match fixing cases, such as the Austrian case including Sanel Kuljić in 2013, the Australian case in 2013,, and the Nepal scandal in 2015. The system has indicated that since 2009, more than 2,000 events have likely been manipulated.

Sportradar launched its Intelligence & Investigation Services (I&I) in 2013. In November 2020, Sportradar announced extending its I&I capabilities to specifically supporting more US clients.

== Federation partnerships ==
Sportradar has partnered with several sports federations to collect or distribute sports data, including Handball-Bundesliga and the ITF.

In 2020, the Board of Control for Cricket in India (BCCI) partnered with Sportradar to support its Anti Corruption Unit (ACU) in monitoring all games that were played in the 2020 season of the India Premier League (IPL).
