= March 2005 in sports =

| << | March 2005 | | | | | >> |
| Su | Mo | Tu | We | Th | Fr | Sa |
| | | 1 | 2 | 3 | 4 | 5 |
| 6 | 7 | 8 | 9 | 10 | 11 | 12 |
| 13 | 14 | 15 | 16 | 17 | 18 | 19 |
| 20 | 21 | 22 | 23 | 24 | 25 | 26 |
| 27 | 28 | 29 | 30 | 31 |
India; Sports

This list shows notable sports-related deaths, events, and notable outcomes that occurred in March of 2005.

== Deaths ==
- 27 – Bob Casey
- 26 – Marius Russo
- 16 – Dick Radatz
- 13 – Frank House
- 13 – Danny Gardella
- 9 – Glenn Davis
- 6 – Chuck Thompson
- 5 – Rt Rev David Sheppard
- 3 – Rinus Michels
- 2 – Rick Mahler
- 1 – Brian Luckhurst

== Ongoing events ==
- 12 February–20 November: NASCAR: Nextel Cup season
- 28 February–18 April: Cricket: Pakistan tour India
- 17 Mar-4 April: Basketball: NCAA Tournament
- 31 Mar-15 May: Cricket: S. Africa tour W. Indies

== 31 March 2005 (Thursday) ==
- Football (soccer):
  - A UEFA disciplinary panel fines Chelsea manager José Mourinho CHF 20,000 (€13,000, £8,900) for his actions during a recent Champions League tie with Barcelona, and bans him from the touchline for both legs of Chelsea's Champions League quarterfinal tie with Bayern Munich. (UEFA.com)

== 30 March 2005 (Wednesday) ==
- Football (soccer):
  - Israel comes from behind to draw 1–1 with France in a bad-tempered match in Tel Aviv. The Israeli crowd boos the French national anthem, and Fabien Barthez in particular is subject to intimidation, booing and heckling. French goal-scorer David Trezeguet is sent off after head-butting Israeli defender Tal Ben Haim. Walid Badir scores Israel's equalizer in the 83rd minute. (Sporting Life)
  - Switzerland scores a late goal to win 1–0 over Cyprus. (Haaretz)
  - The USA defeats Guatemala 2–0 in Birmingham, Alabama. Eddie Johnson leads the way for the Americans by scoring a goal in the 11th minute and assisting Steve Ralston's goal in the 68th minute. (AP/ESPN)

== 29 March 2005 (Tuesday) ==
- Cricket
  - Australia (383 and 166/1) beat New Zealand (292 and 254) by 9 wickets in the third Test at Auckland. They win the three-Test series 2–0. (Wisden Cricinfo)
- CIS men's ice hockey
  - The Alberta Golden Bears defeat the Saskatchewan Huskies 4–3 in overtime to win the University Cup.

== 28 March 2005 (Monday) ==
- Cricket
  - Pakistan (570 and 261/2 declared) beat India (449 and 214) by 168 runs in the third Test at Bangalore, drawing the series 1–1. (Wisden Cricinfo)
- Golf
  - Fred Funk wins the repeatedly weather-delayed Players Championship by one stroke over Luke Donald, Tom Lehman, and Scott Verplank. At 48, Funk is the event's oldest winner in its 32-year history, one year after Adam Scott became its youngest champion ever. (AP/ESPN)

== 27 March 2005 (Sunday) ==
- Rowing – The University of Oxford beat the University of Cambridge by two lengths in a time of 16:42 in the 151st Boat Race (BoatRace.org) (BBC)
- Basketball – NCAA Tournament, regional finals (regional seeds included; advancing teams in **bold**):
  - Syracuse Regional:
    - **North Carolina** (1) 88, Wisconsin (6) 82 (AP/ESPN)
  - Austin Regional:
    - **Michigan State** (5) 94, Kentucky (2) 88 (2 OT) (AP/ESPN)

Three of the four weekend's regional finals were decided in overtime, a first for that playoff series, and further evidence of March Madness.

- Ice hockey – By defeating Harvard in the title game of the NCAA Women's Ice Hockey Championship, Minnesota repeated as NCAA Division I national champions. Harvard's loss was its third consecutive championship game disappointment, each time at the hands of a school in the University of Minnesota system.
- Curling – Anette Norberg and her Swedish rink defeat Cassandra Johnson and team United States 10–4 in the **2005 World Women's Curling Championship.** Norway, skipped by Dordi Nordby wins bronze. (CBC)

== 26 March 2005 (Saturday) ==
- Basketball – NCAA Tournament, regional finals (regional seeds included; advancing teams in **bold**):
  - Albuquerque Regional:
    - **Louisville** (4) 93, West Virginia (7) 85 (OT) (AP/ESPN)
  - Chicago Regional:
    - **Illinois** (1) 90, Arizona (3) 89 (OT) (AP/ESPN)

== 25 March 2005 (Friday) ==
- NBA: A bomb threat delays the start of the Indiana Pacers–Detroit Pistons game in Auburn Hills, Michigan by 90 minutes. In the game, the Pacers defeat the Pistons, 94–81. (AP/ESPN)
- Basketball – NCAA Tournament, regional semifinals (regional seeds included; advancing teams in **bold**):
  - Austin Regional:
    - **Michigan State** (5) 78, Duke (1) 68 (AP/ESPN)
    - **Kentucky** (2) 62, Utah (6) 52 (AP/ESPN)
  - Syracuse Regional:
    - **Wisconsin** (6) 65, NC State (10) 56 (AP/ESPN)
    - **North Carolina** (1) 67, Villanova (5) 66 (AP/ESPN)

== 24 March 2005 (Thursday) ==
- Football (soccer): Robert Hoyzer, the German referee at the center of a major match fixing scandal, has told investigators that the gambling ring that paid him to fix matches knew the names of referees who would work UEFA Champions League, UEFA Cup and international matches several days before UEFA announced them publicly. (AP/Yahoo!)
- Basketball – NCAA Tournament, regional semifinals (regional seeds included; advancing teams in **bold**):
  - Albuquerque Regional:
    - **Louisville** (4) 93, Washington (1) 79 (AP/ESPN)
    - **West Virginia** (7) 65, Texas Tech (6) 60 (AP/ESPN)
  - Chicago Regional:
    - **Illinois** (1) 77, Milwaukee (12) 63 (AP/ESPN)
    - **Arizona** (3) 79, Oklahoma State (2) 78 (AP/ESPN)

== 23 March 2005 (Wednesday) ==
- Football (soccer): The executive committee of the Asian Football Confederation (AFC), the governing body for football in Asia, has unanimously endorsed a proposal by Australia to leave its current federation, the Oceania Football Confederation (OFC), and join the AFC. The proposed move would still require Australia to resign from the OFC, formally apply to the AFC, and gain FIFA approval. (Asian Football Confederation) (Reuters/Yahoo!)

== 22 March 2005 (Tuesday) ==
- NCAA basketball: Tennessee women's basketball head coach Pat Summitt wins her 880th game as the Lady Vols defeat Purdue 75–54 in the second round of the 2005 NCAA Women's Division I Basketball Tournament. Her win surpasses legendary North Carolina coach Dean Smith for first all-time in wins amongst men's and women's head coaches. (AP/Yahoo!)
- Cricket: New Zealand (244 and 48/3) draw with Australia (570 for 8 dec) in the 2nd Test at Wellington after the match is abandoned due to rain. (Wisden Cricinfo)

== 20 March 2005 (Sunday) ==
- Ski flying: During the ski flying weekend in Planica, Slovenia, the world record was improved several times. The new best result is 239 metres by Bjørn Einar Romøren of Norway. Janne Ahonen of Finland flew 240 metres, but fell.
- Cricket: India (407 and 407/9 dec) beat Pakistan (393 and 226) by 195 runs in the 2nd Test at Kolkata, taking a 1–0 lead in the series. (Wisden Cricinfo)
- Basketball –
  - In the Canadian Interuniversity Sport men's basketball championship, the Carleton Ravens defeat the Concordia Stingers 68–48.
  - NCAA Tournament, second round (regional seeds included; advancing teams in **bold**):
    - Albuquerque Regional:
      - **Louisville** (4) 76, Georgia Tech (5) 54 (AP/ESPN)
    - Austin Regional:
      - **Michigan State** (5) 72, Vermont (13) 61 (AP/ESPN)
      - **Duke** (1) 63, Mississippi State (9) 55 (AP/ESPN)
    - Chicago Regional:
      - **Oklahoma State** (2) 85, SIU (7) 77 (AP/ESPN)
    - Syracuse Regional:
      - UConn (2) 62, **NC State** (10) 65 (AP/ESPN)
      - Florida (4) 65, **Villanova** (5) 76 (AP/ESPN)
      - **North Carolina** (1) 92, Iowa State (9) 65 (AP/ESPN)
      - **Wisconsin** (6) 71, Bucknell (14) 62 (AP/ESPN)
- Formula One: Fernando Alonso wins the Malaysian Grand Prix for his second career victory in F1. Jarno Trulli and Nick Heidfeld join him on the podium. (Formula1.com)
- NASCAR: Carl Edwards wins the Golden Corral 500 on a last-lap pass of Jimmie Johnson. It is Edwards' first career Nextel Cup victory and comes a day after he won his first career Busch Series race. (NASCAR.com)

== 19 March 2005 (Saturday) ==
- Rugby union: Six Nations
  - Wales complete a Grand Slam by defeating Ireland 32–20 at Millennium Stadium, Cardiff. It's the first Grand Slam by Wales since 1978, and is also Wales' first overall win in the competition since 1994 (when it was still the Five Nations). (BBC)
  - Italy 13–56 France (Stadio Flaminio, Rome) (BBC)
  - England 43–22 Scotland (Twickenham, London) (BBC).
- Basketball – NCAA Tournament, second round (regional seeds included; advancing teams in **bold**):
  - Albuquerque Regional:
    - Gonzaga (3) 67, **Texas Tech** (6) 71 (AP/ESPN)
    - **Washington** (1) 97, Pacific (8) 79 (AP/ESPN)
    - Wake Forest (2) 105, **West Virginia** (7) 111 (2 OT) (AP/ESPN)
  - Austin Regional:
    - Oklahoma (3) 58, **Utah** (6) 67 (AP/ESPN)
    - **Illinois** (1) 71, Nevada (9) 59 (AP/ESPN)
    - **Kentucky** (2) 69, Cincinnati (7) 60 (AP/ESPN)
  - Chicago Regional:
    - **Arizona** (3) 85, UAB (11) 63 (AP/ESPN)
    - Boston College (4) 75, **Milwaukee** (12) 83 (AP/ESPN)

== 18 March 2005 (Friday) ==
- Basketball – NCAA Tournament, first round (regional seeds included; advancing teams in **bold**):
  - Albuquerque Regional:
    - **Louisville** (4) 68, Louisiana-Lafayette (13) 62 (AP/ESPN)
    - **Georgia Tech** (5) 80, George Washington (12) 68 (AP/ESPN)
  - Austin Regional:
    - Syracuse (4) 57, **Vermont** (13) 60 (OT) (AP/ESPN)
    - **Duke** (1) 57, Delaware State (16) 46 (AP/ESPN)
    - **Michigan State** (5) 89, Old Dominion (12) 81 (AP/ESPN)
    - Stanford (8) 70, **Mississippi State** (9) 93 (AP/ESPN)
  - Chicago Regional:
    - **Oklahoma State** (2) 63, SE Louisiana (15) 50 (AP/ESPN)
    - **SIU** (7) 65, St. Mary's (10) 56 (AP/ESPN)
  - Syracuse Regional:
    - Charlotte (7) 63, **NC State** (10) 75 (AP/ESPN)
    - **Florida** (4) 67, Ohio (13) 62 (AP/ESPN)
    - Minnesota (8) 53, **Iowa State** (9) 64 (AP/ESPN)
    - **UConn** (2) 77, UCF (15) 71 (AP/ESPN)
    - **Villanova** (5) 55, New Mexico (12) 47 (AP/ESPN)
    - **North Carolina** (1) 96, Oakland (16) 68 (AP/ESPN)
    - **Wisconsin** (6) 57, Northern Iowa (11) 52 (AP/ESPN)
    - Kansas (3) 63, **Bucknell** (14) 64 (AP/ESPN)

== 17 March 2005 (Thursday) ==
- Football (soccer): UEFA Cup Round of 16, second leg (advancing teams in **bold**):
  - **CSKA Moscow** 2 – 0 Partizan Belgrade (UEFA.com)
  - **Sporting Lisbon** 1 – 0 Middlesbrough (UEFA.com)
  - **Parma** 1 – 0 Sevilla (UEFA.com)
  - **Auxerre** 0 – 0 Lille (UEFA.com)
  - Real Zaragoza 2 – 2 **Austria Vienna** (decided on away goals) (UEFA.com)
- Basketball – NCAA Tournament, first round (regional seeds included; advancing teams in **bold**):
  - Albuquerque Regional:
    - **Pacific** (8) 79, Pittsburgh (9) 71 (AP/ESPN)
    - **Washington** (1) 88, Montana (16) 77 (AP/ESPN)
    - **Wake Forest** (2) 70, Chattanooga (15) 54 (AP/ESPN)
    - **Gonzaga** (3) 74, Winthrop (14) 64 (AP/ESPN)
    - **West Virginia** (7) 63, Creighton (10) 61 (AP/ESPN)
    - **Texas Tech** (6) 78, UCLA (11) 66 (AP/ESPN)
  - Austin Regional:
    - **Kentucky** (2) 72, Eastern Kentucky (15) 64 (AP/ESPN)
    - **Oklahoma** (3) 84, Niagara (14) 67 (AP/ESPN)
    - **Cincinnati** (7) 76, Iowa (10) 64 (AP/ESPN)
    - **Utah** (6) 60, UTEP (11) 54 (AP/ESPN)
  - Chicago Regional:
    - Alabama (5) 73, **Milwaukee** (12) 83 (AP/ESPN)
    - **Boston College** (4) 85, Penn (13) 65 (AP/ESPN)
    - Texas (8) 57, **Nevada** (9) 61 (AP/ESPN)
    - **Arizona** (3) 66, Utah State (14) 53 (AP/ESPN)
    - **Illinois** (1) 67, Fairleigh Dickinson (16) 55 (AP/ESPN)
    - LSU (6) 68, **UAB** (11) 82 (AP/ESPN)

== 16 March 2005 (Wednesday) ==
- Dogsled racing 2005 Iditarod:
  - Robert Sørlie from Norway wins the 1,161-mile (1,868 km) race across the U.S. state of Alaska for the second time.
  - Bjørnar Andersen of Norway in 4th place is the Rookie of the Year, which is the best showing by a rookie in decades.
- Football (soccer) – UEFA Cup, round of 16:
  - Second leg (advancing teams in **bold**):
    - **Newcastle United** 4 – 0 Olympiacos (UEFA.com)
    - **AZ Alkmaar** 2 – 1 Shakhtar Donetsk (UEFA.com)
  - First leg (rescheduled from 10 March):
    - Steaua Bucharest 0 – 0 Villarreal (UEFA.com)

== 15 March 2005 (Tuesday) ==
- Football (soccer):
  - UEFA Champions League, knock-out round of 16, second leg (advancing team in **bold**):
    - **Inter Milan** 3 – 1 Porto (UEFA.com)
  - Gabriel Batistuta, the all-time goals leader for the Argentina national team, announces his retirement. He was last seen playing with a Qatari league team. (Clarin, in Spanish)
- Basketball – NCAA Tournament:
  - Opening round from Dayton, Ohio: Oakland 79, Alabama A&M 69 (AP/ESPN)

== 14 March 2005 (Monday) ==
- Dogsled racing 2005 Iditarod:
  - Robert Sørlie from Norway is the first to reach Unalakleet on March 13 at 8:45 PM AKST (March 14 5:45 UTC), and start the final stretch down the shore of the Bering Sea to Nome. Bjørnar Andersen, Sørlie's teammate, is the only rookie in the top 10.
- NCAA college basketball: Temple University announces that men's head basketball coach John Chaney will coach in the National Invitation Tournament. He had previously been suspended for actions committed on February 28 during a game against Saint Joseph's University.

== 13 March 2005 (Sunday) ==
- Snooker: Ronnie O'Sullivan beats Matthew Stevens 10 frames to 8 to win his third Irish Masters title. (BBC)
- NASCAR: Jimmie Johnson wins the UAW–DaimlerChrysler 400 at the Las Vegas Motor Speedway from Kyle Busch and Kurt Busch. There were a race-record 10 cautions and race-equalling 25 lead changes. (NASCAR)
- Curling:
  - In Pinerolo, Italy, at the World Junior Curling Championships, the Canadian team skipped by Kyle George won gold beating Sweden's Nils Carlsén 6–5 in 11 ends. Scotland won bronze. (CBC) (TSN)
  - 2005 Tim Hortons Brier: Randy Ferbey and his Alberta team win their 4th Brier in 5 years as they defeat Shawn Adams of Nova Scotia 5–4. Ferbey and his team of David Nedohin, Marcel Rocque and Scott Pfeifer make history as the first complete team to win 4 Briers. (CBC sports)
- Baseball:
  - The Kansas City Star reports in today's edition that former major-league player Jeremy Giambi, currently signed to a minor-league contract by the Chicago White Sox, has admitted to having used anabolic steroids. Jeremy's older brother, current major-leaguer Jason Giambi, has previously been linked to steroid use. (AP/ESPN)
  - The New York Daily News reports today that former superstar slugger Mark McGwire was mentioned several times in a federal steroids investigation in the 1990s, although he was not the target of the probe, nor was any evidence collected against him. (AP/ESPN)
- Cricket:
  - Australia (432 and 135/1) beat New Zealand (433 and 131) by 9 wickets in the 1st Test at Christchurch. (Wisden Cricinfo)
  - South Africa (480/7 dec) beat Zimbabwe (265 and 149) by an innings and 62 runs in the 2nd Test at Centurion. (Wisden Cricinfo)
- Rugby union: Six Nations
  - Scotland 22–46 Wales (Murrayfield, Edinburgh) (BBC)
- Golf:
  - PGA Tour: Pádraig Harrington defeats Vijay Singh on the second sudden-death playoff hole to win the Honda Classic at the Country Club at Mirasol. It's Harrington's first win in the United States.
  - PGA European Tour: Ernie Els wins the Qatar Masters.
- Basketball:
  - Canadian Interuniversity Sport – The Simon Fraser Clan defeat the Winnipeg Wesmen 70–60 in the Canadian Interuniversity Sport women's basketball championship (TSN)
- Ice hockey:
  - Canadian Interuniversity Sport – The Wilfrid Laurier Golden Hawks defeat the Alberta Pandas 4–1 in the Canadian Interuniversity Sport women's ice hockey championship (CIS). The loss ended a three-year championship streak for the Pandas, as well as a 112-game undefeated streak against CIS opponents.

== 12 March 2005 (Saturday) ==
- Cricket: Pakistan (312 and 496/9 dec.) draw with India (516 and 85/1) in the 1st Test at Mohali. (Wisden Cricinfo)
- Football (soccer): Swedish referee Anders Frisk announces his retirement with immediate effect, after receiving so-far unspecified threats. (BBC)
- Rugby Union: Six Nations
  - England 39–7 Italy (Twickenham, London) (BBC)
  - Ireland 19–26 France (Lansdowne Road, Dublin) (BBC)
- Sport of athletics – Kerron Clement sets a new Indoor World Record for the 400m at the NCAA championships in Arkansas. (BBC)
- Curling
  - Switzerland, skipped by Tania Grivel wins the Women's World Junior Curling Championships 10–2 over Sweden's Stina Viktorsson. Canada wins bronze. (WCF)
  - 2005 Tim Hortons Brier: In the semi-final, Nova Scotia's Shawn Adams rink defeat Randy Dutiaume and his Manitoba rink 8–7. Nova Scotia will play Randy Ferbey of Alberta in the final. (CBC sports)

== 11 March 2005 (Friday) ==
- Curling – 2005 Tim Hortons Brier: Nova Scotia's Shawn Adams rink defeats Jean-Michel Menard's Quebec rink in the 3–4 game advancing Nova Scotia to the semi-final. In the 1–2 game, Randy Ferbey's Alberta defeats Randy Dutiuame's Manitoba rink 7–4. Manitoba goes to the semis while Alberta gets a bye to the final. (CBC sports) (CBC sports)

== 10 March 2005 (Thursday) ==
- Dogsled racing 2005 Iditarod:
  - Robert Sørlie of Norway wins the Halfway Award at the historic gold rush ghost town of Iditarod, arriving at 1:41 AM AKST (10:41 UTC).
  - Rick Swenson, the only five-time winner of the Iditarod, scratches for the first time in 29 races.
- Football (soccer) – UEFA Cup, round of 16, first leg: (UEFA.com)
  - Partizan Belgrade 1 – 1 CSKA Moscow
  - Olympiacos 1 – 3 Newcastle United
  - Shakhtar Donetsk 1 – 3 AZ Alkmaar
  - Austria Vienna 1 – 1 Real Zaragoza
  - Middlesbrough 2 – 3 Sporting Lisbon
  - Lille 0 – 1 Auxerre
  - Sevilla 0 – 0 Parma
  - Steaua Bucharest – Villarreal (postponed, snow; first leg rescheduled for 16 March, second leg on 20 March)
- Curling: 2005 Tim Hortons Brier – After the round-robin play is completed, Team Alberta, skipped by Randy Ferbey sits at first place with a 9–2 record. In second place is Team Manitoba, skipped by Randy Dutiaume with an 8–3 record. Also with an 8–3 record is Team Nova Scotia, skipped by Shawn Adams who finishes third because they lost their game to Manitoba. Rounding off the playoff-bound teams is Quebec skipped by Jean-Michel Menard at 7–4. (CBC sports)

== 9 March 2005 (Wednesday) ==
- Football (soccer) UEFA Champions League, knock-out round of 16, second leg (advancing teams in **bold**):
  - **Juventus** 2 – 0 Real Madrid (after extra time) (UEFA.com)
  - Bayer Leverkusen 1 – 3 **Liverpool** (UEFA.com)
  - AS Monaco 0 – 2 **PSV** (UEFA.com)
  - Arsenal 1 – 0 **Bayern Munich** (UEFA.com)
- Curling: 2005 Tim Hortons Brier – Randy Ferbey's Alberta rink continues to lead the way with an 8–1 record and wins against Ontario and Yukon/Northwest Territories. Randy Dutiaume's Manitoba rink has sole possession of second place at 7–2 as they won both their games against Nova Scotia and New Brunswick. With one day left of the round-robin, only Alberta has clinched a berth. (CBC sports)

== 8 March 2005 (Tuesday) ==
- Dogsled racing: Norwegian Robert Sørlie, who became the first non-American to win in 2003, takes the lead in the Iditarod Trail Sled Dog Race and arrives first at checkpoints 8 and 9, in Rohn, and Nikolai.
- Football (soccer) UEFA Champions League, knock-out round of 16, second leg (advancing teams in **bold**):
  - **Chelsea** 4 – 2 Barcelona (UEFA.com)
  - **Olympique Lyonnais** 7 – 2 Werder Bremen (UEFA.com)
  - **A.C. Milan** 1 – 0 Manchester United (UEFA.com)
- Curling – 2005 Tim Hortons Brier – Randy Ferbey's Alberta rink pulls away from the pack with wins against Manitoba and Prince Edward Island and have a record of 6–1. Manitoba (skipped by Randy Dutiaume) falls to 5–2 coupled with a win over P.E.I, while Nova Scotia skipped by Shawn Adams win both their games and also sit at 5–2. (CBC sports)

== 7 March 2005 (Monday) ==
- Cycling: Tom Boonen wins the first stage of Paris–Nice, while Erik Dekker takes over the lead in the general ranking.
- Cricket: The International Cricket Council announces it will move its offices from England and Monaco to Dubai in August 2005. (ICC)
- Curling: 2005 Tim Hortons Brier – Randy Ferbey's Alberta rink and Randy Dutiaume's Manitoba rink both lost their first games against Nova Scotia and Northern Ontario respectively while Brad Gushue's Newfoundland and Labrador rink win both their games against Yukon/Northwest Territories and Prince Edward Island to force a 3-way tie for top spot at 4–1. (CBC sports)

== 6 March 2005 (Sunday) ==
- Cricket: Seven players, including Brian Lara, are dropped from the West Indies team over a sponsorship row. (BBC)
- Cycling:
  - The prologue of Paris–Nice is won by Jens Voigt from Germany. Fabian Cancellara is 2nd, Erik Dekker is 3rd.
- Golf:
  - PGA Tour: Tiger Woods defeats Phil Mickelson by one stroke to win the Ford Championship at Doral. The win returns Woods to the top spot in the world rankings. (AP/Yahoo!)
  - European Tour: Ernie Els defeats Miguel Ángel Jiménez by one stroke to win the Dubai Desert Classic. (AP/Yahoo!)
- Motorsport:
  - Formula One: Giancarlo Fisichella wins the opening race of the 2005 Formula One season at the Melbourne Grand Prix Circuit in Australia. Rubens Barrichello finishes second with Fisichella's Renault teammate Fernando Alonso coming third. (Reuters) (Eurosport)
  - NASCAR: Martin Truex Jr. wins the first NASCAR race held in Mexico, the Telcel-Motorola 200 Busch race from the Autodromo Hermanos Rodriguez. {NASCAR.com}
  - IRL IndyCar Series: Dan Wheldon wins the Toyota Indy 300, the inaugural event of the 2005 IRL season. (IndyCar.com)
- Curling – 2005 Tim Hortons Brier: 5-time Brier champion Randy Ferbey and his Alberta rink as well as Randy Dutiaume's Manitoba rink remain the only undefeated teams left, both with 3–0 records. Ferbey beat Newfoundland and Labrador and Northern Ontario while Manitoba beat Yukon/Northwest Territories (CBC sports)

== 5 March 2005 (Saturday) ==
- Rugby union: In the IRB Rugby Aid Match, a team of players from the Southern Hemisphere defeat the team from the Northern Hemisphere 54–19 at Twickenham, London. (Sydney Morning Herald)
- Dogsled racing: Rachael Scdoris became the first legally blind musher to compete in the 1,049-mile Iditarod Trail Sled Dog Race across Alaska, U.S.
- Cricket:
  - Zimbabwe (54 and 265) lose to South Africa (340 for 3 declared) by an innings and 21 runs on the second day of the first Test of their two-Test series at Newlands, Cape Town. A number of records were set in the match: 54 is Zimbabwe's lowest-ever Test total; Jacques Kallis scored Test cricket's fastest-ever half-century in terms of balls bowled; South Africa's run rate of 6.8 was the highest for a first innings. (Wisden Cricinfo)
  - Australia (347 for 5) beat New Zealand (225 for 8) by 122 runs in the fifth and final One Day International at Napier, winning the series in a 5–0 whitewash. (Wisden Cricinfo)
- Curling – 2005 Tim Hortons Brier: Randy Dutiaume's Manitoba rink leads the pack with 2 wins (over British Columbia and Saskatchewan). Other undefeated rinks include Alberta (Randy Ferbey), Newfoundland and Labrador (Brad Gushue), Quebec (Jean-Michel Menard), and Ontario (Wayne Middaugh). (CBC sports)

== 4 March 2005 (Friday) ==
- Ice hockey: Reports indicate that the financiers who offered $3.5 billion for the National Hockey League earlier in the week are willing to increase their offer.
- Boxing: Joseph Serrano undergoes a successful brain surgery to remove a bullet from his head, but he is still listed in critical condition, at a Puerto Rico hospital. (El Vocero, in Spanish)

== 3 March 2005 (Thursday) ==
- Boxing: Former Olympian Joseph Serrano is injured with a gunshot to the head as he was leaving the Bairoa Gym, in Caguas, Puerto Rico. Having debuted at the Cotto vs. Corley undercard days ago, he has a record of 1 win and no losses.

== 2 March 2005 (Wednesday) ==
- Ice hockey: During the NHL's Board of Governors meeting in New York City, two firms from Boston make a proposal to buy the league and all 30 teams for $3.5 billion. League officials are interested, but owners don't seem as much. (The Detroit News)
- Cricket: South Africa (207 for 5) beat Zimbabwe (206 for 8) by 5 wickets in the third and final One Day International at Port Elizabeth, winning the series 3–0.

== 1 March 2005 (Tuesday) ==
- Football (soccer): Arsenal F.C. midfielder Jermaine Pennant, currently on loan to Birmingham City F.C., is found guilty of drink-driving, driving while disqualified, and driving without insurance. He is sentenced to three months in prison. (BBC)
- Cricket: Australia (236 for 3) beat New Zealand (233) by 7 wickets in the fourth One Day International. They lead the five-match series 4–0. (Wisden Cricinfo)
