= Laola1 =

Austrian online sports news portal

LAOLA1
- Type: Private
- Industry: Media
- Founded: 2001; 25 years ago, Austria
- Headquarters: Vienna, Austria
- Key people: Karl Wieseneder, Rainer Geier, Peter Rietzler
- Parent: Sportradar AG
- Website: www.laola1.at

Laola1.at (German pronunciation: [laˈoːla aɪ̯ns aːteː]) is an Austrian online sports news portal. Laola1 has its headquarters in Vienna, along with unas media (the company responsible for video production).

Laola1 is responsible for developments in mobile TV. In 2008, it became the "first made for mobile sports channel", available via DVB-H in association with Vodafone live!, Orange and Hutchison 3G.

According to reports, Laola1.at is the biggest sport portal in Austria on the basis of website hits and unique clients.

Laola1.tv (German pronunciation: [laˈoːla aɪ̯ns teːfaʊ]) is the internet and mobile TV arm of the company which shows live sport coverage as well as highlights and background information.

In 2011, LAOLA1.tv announced that it had produced the official VfB Stuttgart website, adding to other similar projects.

Laola1.at and Laola1.tv are incorporated under the Sportsman media holding group.

The Austrian Hockey League announced record viewing figures in February 2011 both in the arena's and online. Stating one of the reasons for this being the cooperation between the league and their media partners LAOLA1.tv and ServusTV. The livestreams are generally free of charge. The site also offers a paid premium membership, which makes it possible to watch streams and videos in HD quality and reduce advertising. In addition, there is a laola1.tv app. Parallel to laola1.tv, the site laola1.at is operated, which focuses primarily on providing sports news.

Laola1.tv and Laola1.at was acquired by Sportradar in 2016. Laola1.tv and Laola1.at was acquired by I-league in 2018.
