= January 2005 in sports =

| << | January 2005 | | | | | >> |
| Su | Mo | Tu | We | Th | Fr | Sa |
| | | | | | | 1 |
| 2 | 3 | 4 | 5 | 6 | 7 | 8 |
| 9 | 10 | 11 | 12 | 13 | 14 | 15 |
| 16 | 17 | 18 | 19 | 20 | 21 | 22 |
| 23 | 24 | 25 | 26 | 27 | 28 | 29 |
| 30 | 31 |
India; Sports

This list shows notable sports-related deaths, events, and notable outcomes that occurred in January 2005.

== Events in sports ==
=== 31 January 2005 (Monday) ===
- Cricket: Bangladesh (202 for 2) beat Zimbabwe (198) by eight wickets in the fifth One Day International at Dhaka to win the 5-match series 3–2. (BBC)
- Formula One: The WilliamsF1 team launch their 2005 car at Valencia. They also announce that Nick Heidfeld is to partner Mark Webber in a race seat for the season. (BBC)
- Football: The German Football Association (DFB) has appointed a special commission to investigate the ongoing match fixing scandal. It reported that the results of nine matches have been appealed. The German tabloid Bild published the names of three referees and nine players allegedly implicated by admitted fixer Robert Hoyzer. Also, a Munich sports book revealed that it had notified the DFB in August 2004 of unusually heavy betting on two matches worked by Hoyzer. (Reuters/Yahoo!)

=== 30 January 2005 (Sunday) ===
- Football: Match fixing scandal in Germany:
  - Two of the men arrested in Berlin on 28 January have reportedly implicated three Hertha Berlin players in the scheme. The players are alleged to have worked with the arrested men to fix a September 2004 German Cup tie between Hertha and Eintracht Braunschweig, which Braunschweig won 3–2 with the aid of an own goal by one of the accused players. (AP/Yahoo!)
  - Regional league side Paderborn informed the German Football Association that one of its players had accepted money from an unidentified man before the team's German Cup tie with Hamburger SV in August 2004. The referee in this match, Robert Hoyzer, has already admitted to fixing matches. (AP/Yahoo!)
- Cricket: England (103 for 3) beat South Africa (175 for 9) by 26 runs (D/L method) in the first One Day International at Johannesburg. (BBC)

=== 29 January 2005 (Saturday) ===
- Boxing: Nelson Dieppa retains his WBO world Strawweight championship with an eleventh-round knockout of former world champion Alex Sánchez.(El Vocero, in Spanish)
  - Arturo Gatti beats Jesse James Leija by a fifth-round knockout.(Boxingtimes)
- Football: Chelsea Football Club posts the largest annual loss in British football history for the 2003–2004 accounts — £87.8 million (US$166 million, €127 million). This is not a matter of particular concern as the club is bankrolled by its Russian billionaire chairman, Roman Abramovich. Chief Executive Peter Kenyon said that the club intends to break even by financial year 2009–2010. (BBC)
- Cricket: Bangladesh (247 for 9) beat Zimbabwe (188) by 59 runs to win the fourth One-Day International at Dhaka, Bangladesh. (Cricinfo)
- Major League Baseball: Unconfirmed reports that disgruntled star Sammy Sosa was being traded from the Chicago Cubs to the Baltimore Orioles, in exchange for three or more Baltimore players and other considerations. (ESPN) (Sportsline)
- Alpine skiing – Bode Miller wins the men's super-G title in the Alpine World Ski Championships in Italy. (BBC)
- College football bowl game: In the final game of the 2004–2005 college football season, Kansas State's Darren Sproles, Akron's Charlie Frye, and Ohio State's Mike Nugent led the North to a 23–13 win over the South in the Senior Bowl, played in Mobile, Alabama. (AP/Yahoo!)
- Tennis: Marat Safin defeated Lleyton Hewitt to win the 2005 Australian Open Men's Championship 1–6 6–3 6–4 6–4. (AP/ESPN)

=== 28 January 2005 (Friday) ===
- Cross-country skiing: In a simple ceremony during the Norwegian national cross-country skiing championships at Lillehammer, skiers Thomas Alsgaard and Frode Estil finally get their Olympic gold medals won in the Pursuit race of the Salt Lake City 2002 Winter Olympics; the medals were awarded the two Norwegian skiers after Johann Mühlegg of Spain was found guilty of having used doping to win the race (see Cross-country skiing at the 2002 Winter Olympics). For the same reason, teammate Kristen Skjeldal gets his long-delayed bronze medal from the 30 km race (finishing fourth at race day, but ascending to third place after Mühlegg was disqualified). (NRK.no Sport|Ski) (in Norwegian)
- Football: The match fixing scandal in Germany centering on former referee Robert Hoyzer deepened. Four arrests linked to the probe were made in Berlin today. Also, German media reported that Hoyzer told prosecutors that he was paid over €50,000 (USD 65,000) to fix matches, had seen other referees take payoffs, and heard that players were involved in the scheme as well. (AP/Yahoo!)
- Ice hockey: Angela Ruggiero was the first woman to play in a professional, regular season game in the United States, and along with her brother Bill, was the first brother/sister combination to play in a professional hockey game in the US.
- Tennis: Serena Williams overcomes a back injury in the opening game to defeat Lindsay Davenport 2–6, 6–3, 6–0 and win the 2005 Australian Open women's singles. (AP/ESPN)

=== 27 January 2005 (Thursday) ===
- Football: German Football Association (DFB) referee Robert Hoyzer publicly admits that he fixed matches. Hoyzer's actions are believed to have been motivated by links to Croat gambling syndicates. (AP/Yahoo!)

=== 26 January 2005 (Wednesday) ===
- Winter league baseball: The Indios de Mayagüez defeat the Gigantes de Carolina, 10–0 in game eight of their best of nine series, to win their fifteenth Puerto Rico baseball title as a franchise. (El Vocero, in Spanish)
- Rodney Marsh, the former England national football star, has been fired from his position as a pundit on Sky Sports because of a joke he made live on air concerning the Asian tsunami. (Mirror)

=== 25 January 2005 (Tuesday) ===
- Cricket: England (359 and 73 for 4) draw the Fifth Test at Centurion Park, Pretoria against South Africa (247 and 296 for 6 dec) to win their 5 Test match series 2–1. This is the first time in 40 years that England have secured a series victory in South Africa. (Cricinfo)

=== 24 January 2005 (Monday) ===
- Football: The German Football Association (DFB) widens its probe into suspected match fixing by referee Robert Hoyzer, announcing that it will investigate five additional games, four of which Hoyzer worked. The public prosecutor's office in Braunschweig has launched a separate probe of the allegations. (Reuters/Yahoo!)

=== 23 January 2005 (Sunday) ===
- NBA basketball: (NBA)
  - Dallas Mavericks 95, Denver Nuggets 93 in Dallas. (NBA)
  - Toronto Raptors 103, Charlotte Bobcats 92 in Toronto. (NBA)
  - Milwaukee Bucks 101, New York Knicks 96 in New York. (NBA)
  - Miami Heat 97, New Orleans Hornets 68 in Miami. (NBA)
  - Phoenix Suns 113, New Jersey Nets 105 in Phoenix. (NBA)
  - Seattle SuperSonics 122, Utah Jazz 105 in Seattle. (NBA)
  - San Antonio Spurs 103, Sacramento Kings 73 in Sacramento. (NBA)
- NFL Championship Sunday:
  - AFC Championship: The New England Patriots earn their third trip to the Super Bowl in the last four years, 41–27, in Pittsburgh. Patriots quarterback Tom Brady threw for two touchdowns and free safety Eugene Wilson picked off Ben Roethlisberger as many times to snap the latter's 14-game win streak. Wilson's defensive teammate, strong safety Rodney Harrison, returned a third Roethlisberger interception for a touchdown. (AP/ESPN)
  - NFC Championship: The Philadelphia Eagles clinch the NFC title and a berth in Super Bowl XXXIX with a 27–10 win over the Atlanta Falcons in Philadelphia. For the first time since 1980 and only the second time in team history, the Eagles will play in the championship of American football. (AP/ESPN)
- Cycling:
  - Luis León Sánchez is the final victor of the Tour Down Under.

=== 22 January 2005 (Saturday) ===
- Boxing: Marcela Acuña wins the Women's boxing world featherweight title, knocking out Maria Andrea Miranda in three rounds, at Formosa, Argentina. (WBANNETWORK)
  - Former two division world champion Floyd Mayweather Jr. defeated Henry Bruseles by an eighth-round knockout in Miami, in anticipation of an expected bout with Arturo Gatti.(Boxing Central)
- NBA basketball: (NBA)
  - Lenny Wilkens resigns as head coach of the New York Knicks; Herb Williams is named the team's interim head coach. (AP/Yahoo!)
  - Orlando Magic 115, Philadelphia 76ers 111 in Orlando. (NBA)
  - Washington Wizards 95, Indiana Pacers 93 in Indianapolis. (NBA)
  - Atlanta Hawks 100, Boston Celtics 96 in Atlanta. (NBA)
  - Chicago Bulls 100, Detroit Pistons 89 in Auburn Hills, Michigan. (NBA)
  - New Orleans Hornets 88, Los Angeles Clippers 85 in New Orleans. (NBA)
  - Memphis Grizzlies 110, Utah Jazz 94 in Salt Lake City. (NBA)
  - Minnesota Timberwolves 92, Portland Trail Blazers 83 in Portland. (NBA)
  - Cleveland Cavaliers 105, Golden State Warriors 87 in Oakland. (NBA)
- College football bowl game: Led by Michigan State linebacker Ronald Stanley's two defensive touchdowns, the East defeat the West, 20–13, in the Hula Bowl played in Wailuku, Hawaii on the island of Maui. (AP/Yahoo!)
- Football: The German Football Association (DFB) reveals that referee Robert Hoyzer is under investigation for suspected betting on a first-round DFB-Pokal tie between regional league side Paderborn and Bundesliga club Hamburger SV in August 2004, and possibly fixing the match. In the match, HSV took a 2–0 lead, but Hoyzer sent off HSV striker Emile Mpenza in the first half, and later awarded Paderborn two questionable penalties. Paderborn went on to win 4–2. (Reuters/Yahoo!)

=== 21 January 2005 (Friday) ===
- Boxing: Eric Regan causes a mild upset by defeating former world champion Yori Boy Campas by a twelve-round unanimous decision, to retain his continental Jr. Middleweight title. (Boxing Central)
- NBA basketball: (NBA)
  - Dallas Mavericks 105, Charlotte Bobcats 99 in Charlotte. (NBA)
  - Washington Wizards 118, Toronto Raptors 109 in Washington, D.C. (NBA)
  - New Jersey Nets 104, Boston Celtics 98 in East Rutherford, New Jersey. (NBA)
  - Houston Rockets 92, New York Knicks 91 in New York. (NBA)
  - Chicago Bulls 95, Atlanta Hawks 85 in Chicago. (NBA)
  - Milwaukee Bucks 89, Detroit Pistons 86 in Milwaukee. (NBA)
  - Denver Nuggets 92, Memphis Grizzlies 82 in Denver. (NBA)
  - Minnesota Timberwolves 112, Seattle SuperSonics 107 in Seattle. (NBA)
  - San Antonio Spurs 128, Phoenix Suns 123 in overtime in Phoenix. Manu Ginóbili scores a career-high 48 points while Steve Nash notches only 13 in his return. (NBA)
- Football: The United States Soccer Federation and the union that represents the U.S. men's national team reach an agreement that gives the players a pay raise for World Cup qualifiers in exchange for a no-strike pledge through 2005. The USSF had threatened to lock out the players for the team's first game in the CONCACAF final qualifying group on February 9 at Trinidad and Tobago. (AP/Yahoo!)

=== 20 January 2005 (Thursday) ===
- NBA basketball: (NBA)
  - The Houston Rockets defeat the Orlando Magic 108–99 in Orlando. Tracy McGrady scored 27 points in his return to Orlando. (NBA)
  - The Dallas Mavericks defeat the Los Angeles Clippers 99–79 in Dallas. (NBA)

=== 19 January 2005 (Wednesday) ===
- NBA basketball: (NBA)
  - The Boston Celtics end the Chicago Bulls' seven-game win streak with a 92–83 win in Boston. (NBA)
  - The Philadelphia 76ers defeat the Charlotte Bobcats 107–105 in Charlotte. (NBA)
  - The Toronto Raptors defeat the New York Knicks 98–81 in Toronto. (NBA)
  - The Miami Heat defeat the Atlanta Hawks 111–92 in Miami. (NBA)
  - The New Jersey Nets defeat the Milwaukee Bucks 96–90 in East Rutherford, New Jersey. (NBA)
  - The New Orleans Hornets upset the Indiana Pacers 90–87 in New Orleans (NBA)
  - The San Antonio Spurs defeat the Los Angeles Clippers 80–79 in San Antonio. (NBA)
  - The Memphis Grizzlies defeat the Phoenix Suns 88–79 in Phoenix. (NBA)
  - The Cleveland Cavaliers defeat the Portland Trail Blazers 107–101 in Portland. With 27 points, 11 rebounds and 10 assists, LeBron James becomes the youngest player in NBA history to record a triple-double. (NBA)
  - The Los Angeles Lakers defeat the Minnesota Timberwolves 93–90 in L.A. (NBA)
- NFL: Former Oakland Raiders offensive lineman Barret Robbins is formally charged with three counts of attempted murder in an incident involving Miami Beach, Florida policemen which left one officer injured and Robbins hospitalized with two gunshot wounds. (Miami Herald)
- Swimming: FINA strips Montreal of hosting duties for the world swimming championships for 2005 because the city couldn't raise sufficient funds. Athens, host of the 2004 Summer Olympics, looks to be the likely replacement.(USA Today)

=== 18 January 2005 (Tuesday) ===
- NBA basketball: (NBA)
  - Orlando Magic 103, Detroit Pistons 101 in Orlando. (NBA)
  - Dallas Mavericks 137, Washington Wizards 120 in Dallas. (NBA)
  - Indiana Pacers 87, Houston Rockets 74 in Houston. (NBA)
  - Sacramento Kings 113, Portland Trail Blazers 107 in overtime in Sacramento. (NBA)
  - Denver Nuggets 116, Seattle SuperSonics 100 in overtime in Seattle. (NBA)

=== 17 January 2005 (Monday) ===
- NBA basketball: (NBA)
  - Chicago Bulls 88, New York Knicks 86 in New York. (NBA)
  - Milwaukee Bucks 99, Charlotte Bobcats 92 in Charlotte. (NBA)
  - Philadelphia 76ers 95, New Orleans Hornets 91 in Philadelphia. (NBA)
  - New Jersey Nets 85, Atlanta Hawks 84 in Atlanta. (NBA)
  - Sacramento Kings 89, Los Angeles Clippers 83 in L.A. (NBA)
  - Detroit Pistons 94, Phoenix Suns 80 in Auburn Hills, Michigan. (NBA)
  - San Antonio Spurs 101, Washington Wizards 73 in San Antonio. (NBA)
  - Toronto Raptors 100, Minnesota Timberwolves 91 in Minneapolis. (NBA)
  - Memphis Grizzlies 99, Houston Rockets 80 in Memphis. (NBA)
  - Golden State Warriors 107, Denver Nuggets 97 in Oakland. (NBA)
  - Utah Jazz 102, Los Angeles Lakers 94 in L.A. (NBA)
- Tennis: Belgian sports minister Claude Eerdekens states that US Open champion Svetlana Kuznetsova has tested positive for the stimulant ephedrine. (BBC)
- Cricket:
  - England (411 for 8 dec & 332 for 9 dec) beat South Africa (419 & 247) to win the fourth Test match of their five-match series by 77 runs, with approximately 9 overs remaining. It is the first time in 49 years that England have won at the Wanderers Ground, Johannesburg. Matthew Hoggard's 12 for 205 wins him the man of the match award, and improves his World Ranking to 10. England now lead the series 2–1. (Cricinfo)
  - Bangladesh (211 & 285 for 5) and Zimbabwe (298 & 286) draw the second test in Dhaka, Bangladesh. Bangladesh win the two-test series 1–0, their first ever series victory. (BBC)

=== 16 January 2005 (Sunday) ===
- NBA basketball: (NBA)
  - The Toronto Raptors defeat the New Orleans Hornets 102–99 in Toronto. (NBA)
  - The Seattle SuperSonics defeat the Cleveland Cavaliers 105–97 in Seattle. (NBA)
- Dakar Rally Finalists:
  - Motorcycle: Cyril Despres, France, KTM 660 Rally, Team Gauloises KTM, Time 47:27:31, Penalty 9:00
  - Car: Stéphane Peterhansel, Jean-Paul Cottret, France, Mitsubishi Pajero Evo, Team Mitsubishi Motor Sports, Time 52:31:39, Penalty n/a
  - Truck: Firdaus Kabirov, Aydar Belyaev, Andrei Mokeev, Russia, Kamaz 4911, Team Kamaz-Master, Time 71:13:55, Penalty n/a
- NFL Playoffs:
  - The Philadelphia Eagles advance to their fourth consecutive NFC championship game by defeating the Minnesota Vikings in Philadelphia 27–14. Eagles quarterback Donovan McNabb threw for 286 yards and two touchdowns. Although Vikings quarterback Daunte Culpepper threw for 316 yards, he was intercepted twice, and the Vikings also hurt themselves with a personnel mixup on a fake field goal and three key pass interference calls. The Eagles will host the Atlanta Falcons in the NFC Championship Game on January 23. (AP/ESPN)
  - The New England Patriots defeat the Indianapolis Colts in Foxboro, Massachusetts 20–3. The Patriots' Corey Dillon ran for 144 yards in his first playoff appearance, while the Patriots defense yet again frustrated Colts quarterback Peyton Manning. The Patriots will travel to Pittsburgh to face the Pittsburgh Steelers in the AFC Championship Game on January 23. (AP/ESPN)

=== 15 January 2005 (Saturday) ===
- Boxing: Regina Halmich defeats Maryling Hernandez by a ten-round unanimous decision in Germany, to retain her women's boxing WIBF world Flyweight title. (Boxing Central)
- NBA basketball: (NBA)
  - The Chicago Bulls defeat the New York Knicks 86–84 in Chicago. (NBA)
  - The Atlanta Hawks defeat the Charlotte Bobcats 103–95 in Atlanta. (NBA)
  - The Washington Wizards defeat the Phoenix Suns 108–103 in Washington, D.C. (NBA)
  - The Detroit Pistons defeat the Philadelphia 76ers 99–95 in Detroit. (NBA)
  - The Orlando Magic defeat the Indiana Pacers 85–84 in Indianapolis. (NBA)
  - The Minnesota Timberwolves defeat Portland Trail Blazers 92–84 in Minneapolis. (NBA)
  - The Memphis Grizzlies defeat the Milwaukee Bucks 101–82 in Memphis. (NBA)
  - The Dallas Mavericks defeat the New Jersey Nets 98–93 in Dallas. (NBA)
  - The Houston Rockets defeat the San Antonio Spurs 73–67 in Houston. (NBA)
  - The Cleveland Cavaliers defeat the Utah Jazz 84–71 in Salt Lake City. (NBA)
  - The Sacramento Kings defeat the Los Angeles Clippers 99–95 in Sacramento. (NBA)
  - The Los Angeles Lakers defeat the Golden State Warriors 104–102 in Oakland. (NBA)
- NFL Playoffs:
  - The Pittsburgh Steelers defeat the New York Jets in Pittsburgh 20–17 in overtime on Jeff Reed's game-winning 33-yard field goal. The Steelers will host either the New England Patriots or the Indianapolis Colts in the AFC Championship Game on January 23. (AP/Yahoo!)
  - The Atlanta Falcons, behind 327 yards rushing, dominate the St. Louis Rams 47–17 in Atlanta. Michael Vick passed for two touchdowns and ran for 119 yards, and Warrick Dunn added 142 yards on the ground for the Falcons. The Falcons' Allen Rossum set a playoff record with 152 punt return yards, averaging an NFL record of 50.7 yards per return. The Falcons will now face either the Philadelphia Eagles or the Minnesota Vikings in the NFC Championship Game on January 23. (AP/Yahoo!)
- College football bowl games:
  - In the first two post-BCS bowl games, the South squad (led by LSU's Marcus Randall) beats the North by the score of 24–21 in the Gridiron Classic in Lady Lake, Florida, while Stefan LeFors and J. R. Russell (both from Louisville) leads the East team to a 45–27 victory over the West in the East–West Shrine Game in San Francisco.
- Figure skating:
  - Johnny Weir successfully defends his gold medal at the State Farm U.S. Figure Skating Championships at the Rose Garden in Portland, Oregon, getting 5 perfect 6's in his long program. Timothy Goebel wins the silver medal and Evan Lysacek wins the bronze medal. (AP/Yahoo!)
  - Michelle Kwan wins U.S. championships gold for a record-tying ninth time matching a mark set by Maribel Vinson in the 1930s. It's her eighth title in a row, and ninth in the last 10 years. Sasha Cohen wins the silver medal, and 15-year-old Kimmie Meissner wins the bronze medal. Kwan is awarded 4 perfect 6's for her long program, bringing her career total at the U.S. championships to 42. Meissner nails a triple Axel during her free skate, becoming just the second woman in the history of the event to successfully attempt the move. Tonya Harding was the first to do so in 1991. (AP/SF Chronicle)

=== 14 January 2005 (Friday) ===
- NBA basketball: (NBA)
  - The Indiana Pacers defeat the Phoenix Suns 103–81 in Indianapolis. (NBA)
  - The Philadelphia 76ers defeat the Toronto Raptors 106–96 in Philadelphia. (NBA)
  - The Memphis Grizzlies defeat the Charlotte Bobcats 109–89 in Charlotte. (NBA)
  - The Boston Celtics defeat the Atlanta Hawks 106–96 in Boston. (NBA)
  - The San Antonio Spurs defeat the Dallas Mavericks 98–95 in San Antonio. (NBA)
  - In Grant Hill's first game back in Detroit, the Detroit Pistons defeat Hill's Orlando Magic 101–94. Hill scored 17 points in the contest. (NBA)
  - The New Orleans Hornets get their third win in four games by defeating the Portland Trail Blazers 112–106 in New Orleans. Both teams combined for a record 23 three-point field goals in the first half. (NBA)
  - The Washington Wizards defeat the Milwaukee Bucks 105–103 in Milwaukee. (NBA)
  - The Minnesota Timberwolves defeat the Denver Nuggets 93–83 in Denver, snapping a four-game losing streak. With 1.7 seconds to go in the third quarter, a brawl broke out between Minnesota's Michael Olowokandi and Denver's Nenê; both were ejected as a result. (NBA)
  - The Seattle SuperSonics defeat the Golden State Warriors 103–84 in Seattle. (NBA)
  - The Los Angeles Clippers outlast the Miami Heat 114–112 in double overtime in L.A. (NBA)
- NCAA basketball
  - The University of Southern California announce Tim Floyd as their choice for the position of head men's basketball coach. (AP/Yahoo!)
- Figure skating:
  - In ice dancing, Tanith Belbin and Benjamin Agosto win their second straight gold medal at the State Farm U.S. Figure Skating Championships. The pair got perfect 6's across the board for presentation in the free dance, making them the first performers in the history of the event to get perfect 6's from all nine judges. They had already gotten 5 perfect 6's earlier in the event. They are now second on the all-time perfect 6's list at the U.S. skating championships with 14, behind Michelle Kwan.
  - In the pairs event, Katie Orscher and Garrett Lucash win their first U.S. title after two straight silver medals.

=== 13 January 2005 (Thursday) ===
- NBA basketball: (NBA)
  - The Houston Rockets defeat the New Jersey Nets 94–85 in overtime in Houston. (NBA)
  - The Sacramento Kings defeat the Utah Jazz 107–93 in Sacramento. (NBA)
  - The Los Angeles Lakers defeat the Cleveland Cavaliers 98–94 in L.A. Lakers guard Kobe Bryant left the game midway through the first quarter as he suffered a high ankle sprain after landing on Cleveland guard Ira Newble's foot while attempting a rebound. (NBA)

=== 12 January 2005 (Wednesday) ===
- NBA basketball (NBA):
  - The Toronto Raptors defeat the Boston Celtics, 104–93, in Toronto. (NBA)
  - The Washington Wizards outlast the Portland Trail Blazers to win, 104–100, in Washington. (NBA)
  - The Detroit Pistons easily defeat the New Orleans Hornets, 90–76, in Detroit. (NBA)
  - Despite 19 points, 25 rebounds, and 8 assists from Minnesota superstar Kevin Garnett, the Orlando Magic defeats the Minnesota Timberwolves, 87–80, in Minneapolis. (NBA)
  - Outscoring the Sixers 36–17 in the fourth quarter, the Chicago Bulls rout the Philadelphia 76ers, 110–78, in Chicago. Chicago, which started the season 0–9, has now won 5 games in a row, and has moved into playoff contention. (NBA)
  - The San Antonio Spurs defeat the Milwaukee Bucks, 94–79, in San Antonio. (NBA)
  - Behind 54 points and 24 rebounds from Jazz secondaries Mehmet Okur, Raja Bell, and Raúl López, the Utah Jazz defeats the Phoenix Suns, 115–108, in Salt Lake City, and end the Suns' 7-game winning streak. The Utah bench outscored its Phoenix counterpart 67–6. (NBA)
  - The Denver Nuggets end a 5-game losing streak by upsetting the Los Angeles Lakers, 95–83, in Denver. (NBA)
  - The Houston Rockets end the Dallas Mavericks' 5-game winning streak by winning, 124–114, in Dallas. (NBA)

=== 11 January 2005 (Tuesday) ===
- Italian driver Fabrizio Meoni becomes the second driver to be killed in as many days in Stage 11 of the Dakar Rally. (TSN)
- MLB baseball: A day after a confrontation with a member of the New York City media, Randy Johnson is introduced as the newest member of the New York Yankees. (AP/Yahoo!)
- NBA basketball:
  - The Cleveland Cavaliers outlast the Charlotte Bobcats to win in overtime, 100–98, in Cleveland. (NBA)
  - The Detroit Pistons defeat the New Jersey Nets, 89–80, in East Rutherford. (NBA)
  - The New Orleans Hornets defeat the New York Knicks, 88–82, in New York.
  - The Atlanta Hawks rout the Milwaukee Bucks, 103–80, in Atlanta. (NBA)
  - The Indiana Pacers defeat the Memphis Grizzlies, 86–85, in Memphis. (NBA)
  - The Phoenix Suns defeat the Miami Heat, 122–107, in Phoenix. (NBA)
  - The Sacramento Kings defeat the Denver Nuggets, 109–100, in Sacramento. (NBA)
  - The Seattle SuperSonics defeat the Los Angeles Clippers, 104–99, in Seattle. (NBA)

=== 10 January 2005 (Monday) ===
- Cricket:
  - The ICC World XI (344 for 8) beat the ACC Asian XI (232) by 112 runs to win the first One Day International for the World Cricket Tsunami Appeal. It is the first time an ODI has been played that has not been between two cricketing nations. (MCG)(Cricinfo)
  - Bangladesh (488 & 204/9 dec) defeat Zimbabwe (312 & 154) by 226 runs in the first test of their two-test series at Chittagong, Bangladesh to record their first ever test victory. (Cricinfo)
  - The famous 200-year-old lime tree in the outfield at the St Lawrence Ground in Canterbury, Kent, England has been reduced to a seven-foot stump by the gales currently lashing Britain. (Cricinfo)
- National Football League: Indianapolis Colts quarterback Peyton Manning is named the NFL's most valuable player by the Associated Press. Manning threw a league record 49 touchdowns in the 2004 regular season. He received 47 of 48 first-place votes, with the other going to Michael Vick of the Atlanta Falcons. (Bloomberg)
- NBA basketball:
  - The Boston Celtics defeat the Orlando Magic, 119–101, in Boston. (NBA)
  - Behind 8 3-pointers from Nick Van Exel, the Portland Trail Blazers defeat the Philadelphia 76ers, 109–100, in Philadelphia. (NBA)
  - Shooting 16-of-35 from 3-point range, the Los Angeles Lakers defeat the Minnesota Timberwolves, 105–96, in Minneapolis. (NBA)
  - The Chicago Bulls outlast the Golden State Warriors to win, 94–85, in Chicago. (NBA)
  - The Utah Jazz breaks a 9-game losing streak by defeating the second-ranked San Antonio Spurs, 97–96, in Salt Lake City, as Mehmet Okur makes a buzzer-beating layup. Okur had 23 points and 11 rebounds in 37 minutes off the bench. (NBA)

=== 9 January 2005 (Sunday) ===
- NFL Playoffs:
  - Peyton Manning throws for 457 yards for four touchdowns and just one interception, and makes 27 of 33 passes as the Indianapolis Colts rout the Denver Broncos 49–24 in Indianapolis. Reggie Wayne had 221 yards receiving and two touchdowns on just ten catches. This makes Denver the only wild-card team not to win in the first round of the playoffs this year.
  - The Minnesota Vikings defeat the Green Bay Packers 31–17 in Green Bay behind 284 yards and 4 touchdown passes by Daunte Culpepper with no interceptions. Brett Favre of the Green Bay Packers throws four interceptions and just one touchdown on 216 yards passing.

=== 8 January 2005 (Saturday) ===
- NFL Playoffs:
  - The St. Louis Rams defeat the Seattle Seahawks 27–20 in Seattle on a late 4th-quarter touchdown pass by Marc Bulger, making the Rams the first team with an 8–8 record to win a playoff game. (AP/ESPN)
  - The New York Jets defeat the San Diego Chargers 20–17 in San Diego on a Doug Brien field goal with 5 seconds left in the first overtime period. (AP/ESPN)
- NBA basketball:
  - The Cleveland Cavaliers defeat the New York Knicks, 104–79, in Cleveland. (NBA)
  - The San Antonio Spurs defeat the Denver Nuggets, 99–90, in San Antonio. (NBA)

=== 7 January 2005 (Friday) ===
- NBA basketball:
  - The Milwaukee Bucks needed overtime to defeat the Toronto Raptors, 107–105, in Toronto. (NBA)
  - In a meeting between the first two picks of the 2004 NBA draft, Dwight Howard and the Orlando Magic defeat Emeka Okafor and the Charlotte Bobcats, 111–91, in Orlando. (NBA)
  - The Detroit Pistons defeat the Boston Celtics, 110–104, in Boston. (NBA)
  - The New Jersey Nets defeat the Golden State Warriors, 82–72, in East Rutherford, New Jersey. (NBA)
  - The Sacramento Kings defeat the Atlanta Hawks, 100–97, in Atlanta. (NBA)
  - The Memphis Grizzlies defeat the New Orleans Hornets, 84–76, in Memphis (NBA)
  - The Minnesota Timberwolves defeat the Philadelphia 76ers, 89–84, in Minneapolis. (NBA)
  - The Chicago Bulls defeat the Utah Jazz, 84–78, in Chicago. (NBA)
  - The Miami Heat defeat the Portland Trail Blazers, 103–92, in Portland. (NBA)
  - The Los Angeles Lakers defeat the Houston Rockets, 111–104, in L.A. (NBA)

=== 6 January 2005 (Thursday) ===
- Tennis Hopman Cup:
  - USA 1 – 2 Slovak Republic
  - Russia 1 – 2 Italy
  - Argentina 2 – 1 Germany (ABC)
- Cricket: South Africa (441 and 222–8 dec) beat England (163 and 304) by 196 runs in the third Test in Cape Town. It's England's first Test defeat since December 2003. (BBC)
- Boxing:
  - Bobby Chacon, Duilio Loi, Barry McGuigan, Terry Norris, and Bert Randolph Sugar are among a group of 15 elected into the International Boxing Hall of Fame. (AP/SF Chronicle)
  - Former three-division world champion Héctor Camacho is arrested on charges of burglary and possession of ecstasy. (AOL)
- NBA basketball:
  - Behind 48 points from guards Larry Hughes and Gilbert Arenas, the Washington Wizards defeat the Seattle SuperSonics 107–96 in Washington, D.C. (NBA)
  - Making 12 of 21 3-point attempts, the Memphis Grizzlies rout the Detroit Pistons 101–79 in Detroit. Detroit guard Richard Hamilton is held to 0-of-10 shooting from the floor but connects on all 14 free throws to become the first player in league history to lead his team in scoring without making a field goal. (NBA)
  - The San Antonio Spurs defeat the Indiana Pacers 111–98 in San Antonio. (NBA)

=== 5 January 2005 (Wednesday) ===
- NBA basketball:
  - The Charlotte Bobcats defeat the Minnesota Timberwolves, 102–84, in Charlotte. (NBA)
  - The Cleveland Cavaliers defeat the Atlanta Hawks, 101–85, in Cleveland. (NBA)
  - The Boston Celtics defeat the Golden State Warriors, 84–83, in Boston. (NBA)
  - The Toronto Raptors defeat the Sacramento Kings, 96–93, in Toronto. (NBA)
  - The Orlando Magic defeat the Seattle SuperSonics, 105–87, in Orlando. (NBA)
  - The Miami Heat defeat the New York Knicks 102–94 in Miami. (NBA)
  - The Milwaukee Bucks defeat the New Jersey Nets 97–74 in Milwaukee. (NBA)
  - The Chicago Bulls defeat the New Orleans Hornets 95–89 in New Orleans. (NBA)
  - The Dallas Mavericks defeat the Los Angeles Lakers 118–104 in Dallas. (NBA)
  - The Phoenix Suns defeat the Houston Rockets 108–98 in Houston. (NBA)
  - The Philadelphia 76ers defeat the Utah Jazz 106–99 in Salt Lake City. (NBA)
  - The Los Angeles Clippers defeat the Portland Trail Blazers 102–98 in L.A. (NBA)

=== 4 January 2005 (Tuesday) ===
- Canada defeats Russia 6–1 to win the 2005 World Junior Ice Hockey Championships.
- College football bowl game, Bowl Championship Series: The USC Trojans crush the Oklahoma Sooners 55–19 in the Orange Bowl, assuring the Trojans the NCAA Division I-A BCS championship. (ESPN)
- Wade Boggs and Ryne Sandberg are elected to the Baseball Hall of Fame in balloting by the BBWAA.
- NBA:
  - The Washington Wizards defeat the New Jersey Nets, 112–88, in Washington, D.C. (NBA)
  - Jermaine O'Neal records 55 points and 11 rebounds as the Indiana Pacers defeat the Milwaukee Bucks, 116–99, in Indianapolis. O'Neal will donate $55,000 to UNICEF's tsunami relief fund. (NBA)
  - The Sacramento Kings defeat the New York Knicks, 105–98, in New York City. (NBA)
  - Despite 2004 MVP Kevin Garnett's career-high 47 points and 17 rebounds, the Phoenix Suns outlast the Minnesota Timberwolves to win, 122–115, in Minneapolis. (NBA)
  - Shooting 15-for-30 3-pointers, the San Antonio Spurs rout the Los Angeles Lakers, 101–83, in San Antonio. (NBA)

=== 3 January 2005 (Monday) ===
- College football bowl game, Bowl Championship Series: The Auburn Tigers become the second Division I-A team to complete a perfect 2004–05 season, defeating the Virginia Tech Hokies 16–13 in the Sugar Bowl. (ESPN)
- NBA:
  - Boston Celtics 108, New Orleans Hornets 90 at the FleetCenter. This is the Hornets' eighth straight loss, putting them at 2–27 overall. (NBA)
  - Toronto Raptors 105, Orlando Magic 94 at the Air Canada Centre. Toronto breaks a 3-game losing streak. (NBA)
  - Cleveland Cavaliers 94, Charlotte Bobcats 83 at the Charlotte Coliseum. Rookie Emeka Okafor's 19-game double-double streak comes to an end as he records only 6 rebounds and 12 points. (NBA)
  - Seattle SuperSonics 98, Miami Heat 96 at the AmericanAirlines Arena. The loss snaps Miami's club-record 14-game winning streak. (NBA)
  - Memphis Grizzlies 92, Utah Jazz 82 at the FedExForum. (NBA)
  - Detroit Pistons 87, Chicago Bulls 80 at the United Center. (NBA)
  - Los Angeles Clippers 102, Denver Nuggets 98 at the Pepsi Center. (NBA)
  - Philadelphia 76ers 112, Golden State Warriors 104 at the Oakland Arena. (NBA)

=== 2 January 2005 (Sunday) ===
- NFL Week 17:
  - The Atlanta Falcons' Brian Finneran scores a touchdown with no time remaining in their game against the Seattle Seahawks, but the potential game-tying two-point conversion attempt by Warrick Dunn falls short. The Seahawks win 28–26, clinching the NFC West title in Seattle. (Yahoo!)
  - Jeff Wilkins kicks a 32-yard field goal in overtime to lead the St. Louis Rams to a 32–39 win over the New York Jets in St. Louis. The win puts the Rams in the playoffs, but the Jets also clinch a playoff spot due to Buffalo's loss to Pittsburgh. (Yahoo!)
  - The Pittsburgh Steelers, mostly playing their backups, defeat the Buffalo Bills 29–24 in Orchard Park, New York to knock them out of playoff contention. James Harrison returns a Drew Bledsoe fumble for a touchdown early in the fourth quarter. (Yahoo!)
  - The New Orleans Saints, led by Deuce McAllister's 140 rushing yards, briefly keep their playoff hopes alive with a 21–18 win over the Carolina Panthers in Charlotte, but the Rams' win means their season is over. (Yahoo!)
  - Ladell Betts runs for a career-high 118 yards as the Washington Redskins upset the Minnesota Vikings 21–18 in Raljon, Maryland. The Vikings back into the playoffs thanks to the Saints' win over Carolina. (Yahoo!)
  - The Denver Broncos clinch a playoff spot with a 33–14 win in Denver over the Indianapolis Colts, who were playing few of their starters. The win sets up a rematch in the wild card round next week in Indianapolis. (Yahoo!)
  - The Philadelphia Eagles, also playing mostly backups due to their previous clinching of the number-one seed in the NFC playoffs, lose their second straight game, a 38–10 loss to the Cincinnati Bengals in Cincinnati. (Yahoo!)
  - The Green Bay Packers' defense tie a team record with nine sacks in a 31–14 win over the Chicago Bears in Chicago. (Yahoo!)
  - The New England Patriots' streak of 23 straight games scoring first is broken against the San Francisco 49ers, but the Patriots come back and win 21–7 in Foxboro, Massachusetts. (Yahoo!)
  - The Baltimore Ravens win 30–23 over the Miami Dolphins in Baltimore behind 167 yards rushing by Jamal Lewis. The Ravens' slim playoff hopes were dashed with Denver's win. (Yahoo!)
  - The Jacksonville Jaguars defeat the Oakland Raiders 13–6 in a rainstorm, but are also eliminated from playoff contention with the Bronco win. (Yahoo!)
  - Keith Bulluck returns a fumble for a touchdown as the Tennessee Titans defeat the Detroit Lions 24–19 in Nashville. (Yahoo!)
  - Doug Flutie and Philip Rivers play quarterback for the San Diego Chargers in a 24–17 win over the Kansas City Chiefs in San Diego. Rivers, the second pick in last year's draft who lost the starting job to Drew Brees, threw his first career touchdown pass. (Yahoo!)
  - The Arizona Cardinals, behind a masterful performance from defensive lineman Darnell Dockett, defeat the Tampa Bay Buccaneers 12–7 in Tempe, Arizona. (Yahoo!)
  - The Cleveland Browns end a nine-game losing streak with a 22–14 win over the Houston Texans in Houston. (Yahoo!)
  - Eli Manning throws three touchdowns to lead the New York Giants to a 28–24 win over the Dallas Cowboys in East Rutherford, New Jersey. (Yahoo!)
- Darts:
  - Defending BDO world champion Andy Fordham is knocked out in the first round of the World Darts Championship by Dutchman Vincent Van der Voort (BBC)
  - Defending PDC world champion Phil Taylor powers through to the semi-finals of the Ladbrokes World Championships (BBC)
- NBA:
  - Washington Wizards 104, Atlanta Hawks 101 at MCI Center (NBA)
  - Los Angeles Clippers 89, Philadelphia 76ers 83 at Staples Center (NBA)
  - Detroit Pistons 100, Boston Celtics 98 at The Palace of Auburn Hills. (NBA)
  - Phoenix Suns 117, Portland Trail Blazers 98 at America West Arena. Center Amar'e Stoudemire scores a career-high 50 points and 11 rebounds to lead the Suns. (NBA)
  - Houston Rockets 99, Utah Jazz 80 at the Toyota Center. (NBA)
  - Dallas Mavericks 123, Milwaukee Bucks 104, at American Airlines Center. Dirk Nowitzki leads the Mavericks with 39. (NBA)
  - Sacramento Kings 86, San Antonio Spurs 81 at ARCO Arena. (NBA)
  - Los Angeles Lakers 99, Denver Nuggets 91, also at Staples Center. Kobe Bryant leads the Lakers with 42 points. (NBA)

=== 1 January 2005 (Saturday) ===
- Cricket: The International Cricket Council announces a two-match one-day series between an ICC XI and an Asian XI. The games will raise funds for the humanitarian relief operation in South-East Asia following the tsunami caused by the 2004 Indian Ocean earthquake. The first game will be played at the Melbourne Cricket Ground, Australia on 10 January. The ICC XI will be picked by Sir Richard Hadlee and captained by former Australian captain Steve Waugh and will include players from Australia, New Zealand and the West Indies. The Asian XI will consist of players from India, Pakistan and Sri Lanka. The other four Test-playing nations are currently playing international series and have already pledged funds to the humanitarian relief operation. (Cricinfo)
- College football bowl games (Bowl Championship Series games in italics):
  - The Tennessee Volunteers rout the Texas A&M Aggies 38–7 in the Cotton Bowl Classic. (ESPN)
  - The Georgia Bulldogs defeat the Wisconsin Badgers 24–21 in the Outback Bowl. (ESPN)
  - The Florida State Seminoles defeat the West Virginia Mountaineers 30–18 in the Gator Bowl. (ESPN)
  - The Iowa Hawkeyes defeat the LSU Tigers 30–25 in the Capital One Bowl, scoring the winning touchdown on the game's last play with a 56-yard pass play. (ESPN)
  - In a back-and-forth Rose Bowl, the Texas Longhorns kick a field goal on the game's last play to defeat the Michigan Wolverines 38–37. (ESPN)
  - The Utah Utes complete a perfect season, their first since 1930, by crushing the Pittsburgh Panthers 35–7 in the Fiesta Bowl. (ESPN)
