= February 2005 in sports =

<<	February 2005					>>
Su	Mo	Tu	We	Th	Fr	Sa
		1	2	3	4	5
6	7	8	9	10	11	12
13	14	15	16	17	18	19
20	21	22	23	24	25	26
27	28
India; Sports

This list shows notable sports-related deaths, events, and notable outcomes that occurred in February 2005.

== Events in sports ==
=== 28 February 2005 (Monday) ===
- NCAA basketball: Temple University announces that head men's basketball coach John Chaney will not coach in the Atlantic 10 Conference's tournament. This decision stems from an incident during a game against Saint Joseph's University on 24 February, when Chaney responded to the non-calling of illegal screens by Hawks players by sending in Temple center Nehemiah Ingram to commit hard fouls on Saint Joseph's center John Bryant. (San Diego Union-Tribune) (Youngstown Vindicator) (Temple News)

=== 27 February 2005 (Sunday) ===
- Cricket: South Africa (329 for 6) beat Zimbabwe (198 for 7) by 131 runs in the second One Day International, Durban, and now lead the three-match series 2–0. Wisden Cricinfo
- Cycling: George Hincapie wins Kuurne–Brussels–Kuurne by beating Kevin van Impe in a sprint with 2.
- Football:
  - UEFA Cup round of 32, second leg: Athletic Bilbao 1 – 2 **Austria Vienna** (UEFA.com)
  - Chelsea defeats Liverpool 3–2 after extra time to win the League Cup at the Millennium Stadium in Cardiff. Chelsea manager José Mourinho is sent off by the fourth official for taunting Liverpool fans after Liverpool star Steven Gerrard scores an own goal in the 79th minute to level the match. (BBC)
  - Premier League referee Mike Dean is suspended indefinitely after officials learn of his involvement in a betting website. (The Guardian)
- NASCAR: Greg Biffle wins the Auto Club 500 at the California Speedway from Jimmie Johnson and Kurt Busch, with only 0.525 of a second separating the top three men. (NASCAR.com)
- Rugby union: In the final match of Round 3 of the Six Nations, held in Dublin, Ireland use a try from captain Brian O'Driscoll and 14 points from Ronan O'Gara to defeat England 19–13. The win keeps Ireland on track for a possible Grand Slam showdown with Wales in Cardiff in three weeks. This also marks the first time since 1987 that England has lost three straight Six Nations matches. (BBC)
- Curling: In the final match of the 2005 Scott Tournament of Hearts, Manitoba, led by skip Jennifer Jones, defeats Jenn Hanna's Ontario team 8–6 and becomes the Canadian national women's champion. With the win, Jones' rink has earned the right to represent Canada at the world championship, as well as an entry in the Canadian Olympic curling trials. (CBC sports) (Sportsnet)

=== 26 February 2005 (Saturday) ===
- Boxing: Miguel Cotto wins over Demarcus Corley by TKO after Corley took a knee on the fifth round to avoid further punishment. Cotto's corner immediately tells Corley that they are at the disposal of giving him a rematch.
- Cricket: Australia (264 for 5) beat New Zealand (178) by 86 runs in the third One Day International, Auckland, taking an unassailable 3–0 lead in the five-match series. (Wisden Cricinfo)
- Cycling: Nick Nuyens (Belgium) wins the Omloop "Het Volk". He finishes 14 seconds before the main group, of which his teammate Tom Boonen wins the sprint before Steven de Jongh and Niko Eeckhout.
- Rugby union, Six Nations:
  - Scotland fails to score a try against Italy, but six penalties by Chris Paterson provide all the points Scotland need to score its first win of this year's competition, 18–10, in Edinburgh. (BBC)
  - At Stade de France near Paris, France takes a 15–6 halftime lead over Wales, but the Welsh storm back behind two Martyn Williams tries to score a 24–18 win, keeping Wales on course for a possible Grand Slam. (BBC)
- Curling: 2005 Scott Tournament of Hearts: Ontario's Jenn Hanna rink advance to the finals against Manitoba as they defeated British Columbia's Kelly Scott rink 9–7 in the semi-final. (CBC Sports)

=== 25 February 2005 (Friday) ===
- Lacrosse:
  - 2005 NLL All Star Game
    - East Division All Star Team 11–10 West Division All Star Team
- Cricket: South Africa (301 for 7) beat Zimbabwe (136) by 165 runs in the first One Day International, Johannesburg. (Wisden Cricinfo)
- Curling: 2005 Scott Tournament of Hearts – Defending Scott champion Colleen Jones fails to make it 5 championship wins in a row, as she was ousted by Sandy Comeau's rink from New Brunswick in the morning tie-breaker. Comeau would then play Jenn Hanna's Ontario rink who had beaten Alberta's Cathy King rink in the other morning tie-breaker. Hanna would go on to win the final tie-breaker which determined the last playoff spot. In the evening, the page-playoffs began with Hanna once again winning, defeating Saskatchewan's Stefanie Lawton rink in the 3–4 game for the right to go to the semi-final on Saturday. In the other playoff game, Manitoba's Jennifer Jones rink defeats British Columbia's Kelly Scott rink in the 1–2 game, forcing Scott to play in the semi-final on Saturday and giving Jones a bye to the final on Sunday. (CBC sports)

=== 24 February 2005 (Thursday) ===
- Football – UEFA Cup, round of 32: (UEFA.com)
  - Second leg (advancing clubs in **bold face**):
    - **Middlesbrough** 2 – 1 Grazer AK
    - **Newcastle United** 2 – 1 Heerenveen
    - **Lille** 2 – 0 FC Basel
    - VfB Stuttgart 0 – 2 **Parma** (after extra time)
    - Feyenoord 1 – 2 **Sporting Lisbon**
    - **AZ Alkmaar** 2 – 1 Alemannia
    - Dnipro 0 – 1 **Partizan Belgrade**
    - **Steaua Bucharest** 2 – 0 Valencia (after penalty shootout 4–3)
    - **Auxerre** 3 – 1 Ajax
    - Benfica 1 – 1 **CSKA Moscow**
    - **Real Zaragoza** 2 – 1 Fenerbahçe
    - **Sevilla** 2 – 0 Panathinaikos
    - Schalke 04 0 – 1 **Shakhtar Donetsk**
    - Sochaux 0 – 1 **Olympiacos**
    - **Villarreal** 2 – 0 Dynamo Kyiv
  - First leg (postponed from 16 February):
    - Austria Vienna 0 – 0 Athletic Bilbao
  - Fixtures for knock-out group of 16, to be played on 10 and 16–17 March:
    - Middlesbrough – Sporting
    - Sevilla – Parma
    - Steaua Bucharest – Villarreal
    - Lille – Auxerre
    - Olympiacos – Newcastle
    - Shakhtar – AZ
    - Partizan Belgrade – CSKA Moscow
    - Austria Vienna – Real Zaragoza (tie determined 27 February)
- Curling – 2005 Scott Tournament of Hearts – In the last day of the round robin, Manitoba's Jennifer Jones wins both of her games to finish first at 9–2. She will face British Columbia's Kelly Scott, who finished second at 8–3 in the "1–2" match-up, where the winner gets a bye to the final, and the loser must play in the semi-final. Saskatchewan's Stefanie Lawton finished in third place with a 7–4 record and awaits the winner out of a massive tie for 6–5 which involves Ontario's Jenn Hanna, Alberta's Cathy King, defending champion Colleen Jones and New Brunswick's Sandy Comeau. 3 Tie-breaker games will be played to determine the winner, who will play Lawton in the "3–4" game. (CBC sports)

=== 23 February 2005 (Wednesday) ===
- Football: UEFA Champions League knock-out round of 16, first leg:
  - Barcelona 2 – 1 Chelsea (BBC)
  - Werder Bremen 0 – 3 Lyon (BBC)
  - Manchester United 0 – 1 A.C. Milan (BBC)
  - Porto 1 – 1 Inter Milan (BBC)
- Curling – 2005 Scott Tournament of Hearts: On the second last day of the round-robin, Jennifer Jones' Manitoba rink pulls out of her first place tie with Saskatchewan, only needing one win against Alberta as Lawton lost both of hers. Jones has a 7–2 record while Lawton, along with Team Canada's Colleen Jones and British Columbia's Kelly Scott sit in second place at a 6–3 record. The top 4 teams in the tournament make the playoffs. (CBC sports)

=== 22 February 2005 (Tuesday) ===
- Cricket: Australia (314 for 6) beat New Zealand (208) by 106 runs in the second One Day International. They lead the five-match series 2–0. (Wisden Cricinfo)
- Football: UEFA Champions League knock-out round of 16, first leg:
  - Real Madrid 1 – 0 Juventus (BBC)
  - Liverpool 3 – 1 Bayer Leverkusen (BBC)
  - PSV 1 – 0 AS Monaco (BBC)
  - Bayern Munich 3 – 1 Arsenal (BBC)
- Curling – Scott Tournament of Hearts: The defending champion Colleen Jones rink defeats the previously undefeated Saskatchewan rink skipped by Stefanie Lawton. Jones also won her other game against Nova Scotia and sits at 4–3, while Saskatchewan drops into a tie with Manitoba's Jennifer Jones at 6–1. Jennifer Jones has been on a roll as well, only losing to British Columbia's Kelly Scott in Draw 6. (CBC sports)

=== 21 February 2005 (Monday) ===
- Curling – Scott Tournament of Hearts: Saskatchewan's Stefanie Lawton remains undefeated at 5–0 after beating Newfoundland and Labrador and Prince Edward Island. Defending champions Colleen Jones falls to New Brunswick's Sandy Comeau but defeats Alberta and sits tied in sixth place at 2–3. (CBC sports)

=== 20 February 2005 (Sunday) ===
- 2005 NBA All-Star Game: The Eastern Conference All-Stars defeat the Western Conference All-Stars 125–115 in Denver. Philadelphia 76ers guard Allen Iverson is named MVP with 15 points and four steals in the game. (NBA)
- NASCAR: Jeff Gordon wins the Daytona 500 from Kurt Busch and Dale Earnhardt Jr. (NASCAR)
- Snooker: Ronnie O'Sullivan beats John Higgins 10 frames to 3 to win his second Masters title. (BBC)
- Football: FA Cup fifth round:
  - Burnley 0 – 0 Blackburn Rovers (BBC)
  - Newcastle United 1 – 0 Chelsea (BBC)
  - Tottenham Hotspur 1 – 1 Nottingham Forest (BBC)
- Curling – 2005 Scott Tournament of Hearts: Manitoba's Jennifer Jones and Saskatchewan's Stefanie Lawton remain the only teams to be undefeated as Jones won both of her games and Lawton her game. Both teams are 3–0. Defending champions, Team Canada skipped by Colleen Jones continues her rough start by losing to Manitoba in their morning draw but rebounding with a win over Newfoundland and Labrador's Heather Strong. Team Canada sits at 1–2. (CBC Sports)

=== 19 February 2005 (Saturday) ===
- Football: FA Cup fifth round:
  - Arsenal 1 – 1 Sheffield United
  - Bolton Wanderers 1 – 0 Fulham
  - Charlton Athletic 1 – 2 Leicester City
  - Everton 0 – 2 Manchester United
  - Southampton 2 – 2 Brentford
- Cricket: Australia (236 for 7) beat New Zealand (226) by just 10 runs in the first One Day International at Wellington.
- National Hockey League: Despite 6½ hours of talks between the league and its players union today, the two sides were unable to come to an agreement to end the current lockout. The current season remains canceled, now with no hope of resurrection. (AP/Yahoo!)
- Boxing: Bernard Hopkins makes a successful 20th defense of his middleweight title with a one-sided unanimous decision over Howard Eastman in Los Angeles. Hopkins becomes the first Middleweight champion in boxing history to defend that category's title twenty or more times, and joins Joe Louis and Abe Attell, among few others, in the exclusive group of boxers with 20 or more title defenses in one division. (AP/Yahoo!)(Boxing Central)
- Curling: The 2005 Scott Tournament of Hearts, Canada's national curling championship for women begins play at Mile One Stadium in St. John's, Newfoundland and Labrador. Team Canada's Colleen Jones, the defending champion is upset by Jenn Hanna of team Ontario. Elsewhere, former Scott champion Cathy King of Alberta loses both her games. British Columbia's Kelly Scott and Saskatchewan's Stefanie Lawton both are undefeated at 2–0 while Manitoba's Jennifer Jones, Nova Scotia's Kay Zinck, New Brunswick's Sandy Comeau in addition to Hanna are at 1–0. (CBC sports)

=== 18 February 2005 (Friday) ===
- American football: New England Patriots linebacker Tedy Bruschi suffers a stroke.
- Hockey: Reportedly, the National Hockey League and its players' union, the NHL Players Association, have reached agreement on a deal that would allow a shortened season to be played, despite the league's announced cancellation of the season. Reports, denied by both sides, were that a deal would be signed tomorrow. (AP/Yahoo!) Update: The sides met on 19 February, but talks failed.

=== 17 February 2005 (Thursday) ===
- Cricket: Australia (214 for 5) defeat New Zealand (170) by 44 runs in the first ever international Twenty20 cricket match. (BBC)
- Football
  - UEFA Cup, round of 32, first leg: (UEFA.com)
    - Dynamo Kyiv 0 – 0 Villarreal
    - Grazer AK 2 – 2 Middlesbrough
    - Fenerbahçe 0 – 1 Real Zaragoza
    - FC Basel 0 – 0 Lille
    - Alemannia 0 – 0 AZ
    - Heerenveen 1 – 2 Newcastle United
    - CSKA Moscow 2 – 0 Benfica
    - Olympiacos 1 – 0 Sochaux

=== 16 February 2005 (Wednesday) ===
- Football
  - UEFA Cup, round of 32, first leg: (UEFA.com)
    - Partizan Belgrade 2–2 Dnipro
    - Shakhtar Donetsk 1–1 Schalke 04
    - Ajax 1–0 Auxerre
    - Panathinaikos 1–0 Sevilla
    - Parma 0–0 Stuttgart
    - Sporting Lisbon 2–1 Feyenoord
    - Valencia 2–0 Steaua Bucharest
    - Austria Vienna–Athletic Bilbao: postponed, snow. Rescheduled to 24 February; return leg in Bilbao scheduled for 27 February.
  - UEFA has announced that it will send an investigator to Greece to examine match fixing allegations surrounding a December 2004 UEFA Cup tie between Panionios and Dinamo Tbilisi, including possible links to the ongoing match fixing scandal in Germany. (Reuters/Yahoo!)
- Ice hockey: National Hockey League commissioner Gary Bettman announces the cancellation of the 2004–05 NHL season on account of the ongoing lockout in the first sport in North American history to cancel an entire season due to such a dispute.

=== 15 February 2005 (Tuesday) ===
- Cycling: Lance Armstrong announces his intentions to compete for a seventh consecutive win in the upcoming Tour de France, ending speculation as to whether he would race this year or in 2006. (BBC Sport)
- Football:
  - In the Football for Hope tsunami relief match in Barcelona, a World side captained by Ronaldinho defeats a European side captained by Andriy Shevchenko 6–3. The match, although held in a more than half-empty Nou Camp, raised over US$3 million. (FIFA.com) (AP/Yahoo!)
  - Match fixing scandal in Germany: (AFP/Yahoo!)
    - The German Football Association (DFB) has announced that one of four matches acknowledged to be fixed by Robert Hoyzer, a 22 October 2004 2. Bundesliga fixture between Ahlen and Wacker Burghausen, will be replayed.
    - The DFB also suspended referee Dominik Marks after it was alleged that he received EUR 36,000 for fixing two matches.
    - The police are set to interrogate Hoyzer about a total of 63 matches in which he was involved.
  - April Heinrichs resigns her position as coach of the United States women's national soccer team. (AP/Yahoo!)
- Formula One: Minardi confirmed Austrian Patrick Friesacher as their second driver for the 2005 season, to partner Christijan Albers.

=== 14 February 2005 (Monday) ===
- Hare coursing:
  - As the final Waterloo Cup event in England starts in Altcar, four anti-coursing protesters are arrested. The event is expected to attract up to 10,000 spectators over its 3 days. (BBC) (BBC)
- Ice hockey:
  - After last-minute talks between the National Hockey League and the league's players' union failed to resolve the current labor dispute, the NHL has scheduled a press conference on 16 February, at which it is expected to call off the 2004–05 season. (AP/Yahoo!)
  - The Boston University Terriers defeat the Northeastern Huskies 3–2 in overtime to win the 53rd annual Beanpot hockey tournament. (AP/ESPN)
- American football: Arizona businessman Reggie Fowler agrees to buy the Minnesota Vikings from Red McCombs for US$625 million, possibly becoming the first African-American owner of an NFL team (subject to NFL approval). However, this is soon overshadowed by a number of public relations gaffes by Fowler and his associates—most notably, padding his résumé with false or misleading information. (CNN/SI)

=== 13 February 2005 (Sunday) ===
- American football: Pro Bowl – In the concluding game of the 2004–2005 NFL season, held in Hawaii, the AFC all-stars beat the NFC by the score of 38–27.
- Basketball: Karl Malone the Mailman retires.
- Cricket: South Africa (241 for 7) beat England (240) by 3 wickets in the seventh and final One Day International at Pretoria, winning the ODI series 4–1. (BBC)
- Rugby union – Six Nations: In the final match of the second round at Twickenham in London, France comes back from a 17–6 halftime deficit to defeat England 18–17. (BBC)

=== 12 February 2005 (Saturday) ===
- Football: Disgraced German referee Robert Hoyzer is formally arrested after German prosecutors find evidence that he may have fixed more matches than those he has admitted to manipulating. (Reuters/Yahoo!)
- Rugby union – Six Nations:
  - In the second round of matches, Wales record their first away win in the Six Nations for nearly four years when they defeat Italy 8–38 in Rome's Stadio Flaminio. (BBC).
  - Meanwhile, despite injuries sustained in last week's match against Italy, Ireland overwhelm Scotland by 13–40 at Edinburgh's Murrayfield. (BBC)
- College basketball (men): Illinois defeats Wisconsin to go 25–0 for the season. (ESPN)
- NBA (NBA):
  - Flip Saunders is fired as head coach of the underachieving Minnesota Timberwolves following a 25–26 start, which came in spite of having virtually the same team that they had when they posted the best record in the Western Conference the previous year. ESPN.com
  - Allen Iverson scores a career- and season-high 60 points as the Philadelphia 76ers defeat the Orlando Magic 112–99 in Philadelphia. (NBA)
  - Detroit Pistons 107, Washington Wizards 86 in Auburn Hills, Michigan. (NBA)
  - Milwaukee Bucks 113, Atlanta Hawks 83 in Milwaukee. (NBA)

=== 11 February 2005 (Friday) ===
- Football: The German Football Association (DFB) announces it will pay Bundesliga club Hamburger SV €500,000 as direct compensation for its tainted DFB-Pokal loss in August 2004, which was one of several games fixed by disgraced referee Robert Hoyzer. The DFB also announced that a Germany international friendly will be played at Hamburg's AOL Arena in October 2005, with a potential extra profit of €1.5 million to HSV. (AFP/Yahoo!)
- NBA: Basketball great Karl Malone announces his retirement on Sunday (AP/Yahoo!), while Reggie Miller announces his retirement effective at the end of this season. (AP/Yahoo!)

=== 10 February 2005 (Thursday) ===
- Cricket: The sixth One Day International between South Africa and England at Durban is abandoned at the half-way point due to bad weather, handing victory in the series to South Africa with one match left to play. (Wisden Cricinfo)
- Football (soccer): Match fixing scandal in Germany
  - Disgraced referee Robert Hoyzer has been suspended by the German Football Association (DFB) for "unsportsmanlike conduct." He faces a formal DFB hearing that could lead to a lifetime ban, and possible criminal prosecution that could result in a prison sentence of up to 10 years. (AP/Yahoo!)
  - Police in Austria are launching an investigation into whether a goalkeeper for the Austrian first division club SW Bregenz is involved with the match-fixing ring. Hoyzer has reportedly told German authorities that there was a link between the ring and the Austrian club. (Reuters/Yahoo!)
- NBA: Indiana Pacers great Reggie Miller will retire at the end of the current season, according to a report on TNT by his older sister Cheryl Miller, a former basketball great in her own right. (AP/Yahoo!)

=== 9 February 2005 (Wednesday) ===
- National Basketball Association (NBA):
  - After being down by 18 points at halftime, the Boston Celtics put together a 16–0 run in the fourth quarter to defeat the Los Angeles Clippers 94–89 in Boston. (NBA)
  - Indiana Pacers 94, Charlotte Bobcats 87 in Indianapolis. (NBA)
  - Washington Wizards 95, San Antonio Spurs 87 in Washington, D.C. (NBA)
  - Milwaukee Bucks 110, Toronto Raptors 107 in Toronto. (NBA)
  - Memphis Grizzlies 98, Philadelphia 76ers 95 in Philadelphia. (NBA)
  - Miami Heat 116, New York Knicks 110 OT in New York. (NBA)
  - Los Angeles Lakers 104, New Jersey Nets 103 OT in East Rutherford, New Jersey (NBA)
  - Minnesota Timberwolves 98, Denver Nuggets 92 in Minneapolis. (NBA)
  - Houston Rockets 105, Chicago Bulls 92 in Houston. (NBA)
  - New Orleans Hornets 91, Portland Trail Blazers 80 in Portland. (NBA)
- Football (soccer): 2006 FIFA World Cup qualifying continues in four regions:
  - Asia: Stage 3, Matchday 1 of 6
    - **Korea Republic** 2–0 Kuwait
    - **Japan** 2–1 Korea DPR
    - Bahrain 0–0 Iran
    - Uzbekistan 1–1 Saudi Arabia
  - Africa: **Morocco** 5–1 Kenya
  - Europe
    - **Spain** 5–0 San Marino
    - **Greece** 2–1 Denmark
    - Albania 0–2 **Ukraine**
    - Macedonia FYR 1–1 Andorra
  - CONCACAF: Final Stage, Matchday 1 of 10
    - Costa Rica 1–2 **Mexico**
    - Trinidad and Tobago 1–2 **United States**
    - Panama 0–0 Guatemala
- Cricket: South Africa (311 for 7) beat England (304 for 8) by 7 runs in the closely fought fifth One Day International at East London, taking an unassailable 3–1 lead in the seven-match series. (Wisden Cricinfo)
- Doping, cross-country skiing: French skier Vincent Vittoz, currently ranked No. 2 in the XC skiing World Cup season, is cleared of the charges of having taken the banned diuretic furosemide. Part B of the drug test process removed the doubts. (eurosport.com)

=== 8 February 2005 (Tuesday) ===
- Snooker: After hearing of a sponsorship deal from HP Foods, makers of brown sauce, whereby the HP logo will be present on the brown ball at all major tournaments, Jimmy White announces he has changed his name by deed poll to 'Jimmy Brown', and will wear brown clothing with a blue bow tie when competing at the upcoming Masters tournament. He has not ruled out either changing his name back after the tournament or keeping his new name.

=== 7 February 2005 (Monday) ===
- Sailing: Ellen MacArthur breaks the record for a single-handed non-stop round-the-world voyage, with a time of 71 days, 14 hours, 18 minutes and 33 seconds for the 27,000-mile voyage. (BBC)

=== 6 February 2005 (Sunday) ===
- American football: Super Bowl XXXIX: The New England Patriots becomes the first team since the 1997–1998 Denver Broncos to repeat as World Champions in their defeat of the Philadelphia Eagles 24–21 in Jacksonville, Florida. In the process, Deion Branch, the game's most valuable player, gets a Super Bowl-tying record 11 passes for 133 yards. (AP/Yahoo!) (AP/ESPN)
- Rugby union – Six Nations: In the final game of the opening round of matches, Ireland defeat Italy in Rome 28–17 after a hard-fought match, with Italy scoring a last-minute try. Ireland stars Brian O'Driscoll and Gordon D'Arcy both suffered hamstring injuries and are doubtful for next week's match at Murrayfield against Scotland. (BBC)
- Cricket:
  - South Africa (291 for 5) beat England (183) by 108 runs in the fourth One Day International at Cape Town, taking a 2–1 lead in the seven-match series. (Wisden Cricinfo)
  - Australia (239 for 9) beat Pakistan (208) by 21 runs to win the final of the VB Series at Sydney. (Wisden Cricinfo)
- Handball: the 2005 World Men's Handball Championship title goes to Spain who defeat Croatia in the final 40:34, while France beat Tunisia by just one goal (26:25) to get the bronze. (AP/Yahoo!) (Eurosport)
- Cycling: Australia's Graeme Brown wins his fifth stage in the Tour de Langkawi. The winner of the overall ranking is Ryan Cox (South Africa)

=== 5 February 2005 (Saturday) ===
- National Football League: Quarterbacks Dan Marino and Steve Young are selected to the Pro Football Hall of Fame in their first years of eligibility. They are joined by two early NFL pioneers, quarterback Benny Friedman and Fritz Pollard, the first prominent African-American in the NFL. (AP/Yahoo!)
- Rugby union – Six Nations:
  - In the opener of the competition in Saint-Denis, France, France comes back from a 9–0 deficit early in the second half to defeat Scotland 16–9. (BBC)
  - Meanwhile, Wales beat England 11–9 at the Millennium Stadium to claim their first victory over England at Cardiff since 1993. (BBC)
- Handball: Semifinals of the 2005 World Men's Handball Championship: Spain defeats the host Tunisia, while France loses to reigning champions Croatia.

=== 4 February 2005 (Friday) ===
- Football: The parent company of 115-year-old Servette Football Club from Geneva, Switzerland, is declared bankrupt with debts of over 10 million Swiss francs. The club will be demoted two divisions. (SBS)
- Cricket:
  - South Africa (270 for 7) beat England (267 for 8) by three wickets in the third One Day International at Port Elizabeth, levelling the one-day series at 1–1. (BBC)
  - Australia (237) beat Pakistan (219 for 9) by 18 runs in the first match of the three-match final of the VB Series. (BBC)
- Cycling: Ryan Cox (South Africa) wins the eighth stage in the Tour de Langkawi. It is the heaviest stage, with the finish on Genting Highlands. (Eurosport)
- Rugby league: Leeds Rhinos of the Super League defeat the Canterbury Bulldogs of the NRL 39–32 in a bruising World Club Challenge at Elland Road, Leeds, despite a spirited Canterbury come-back in the second half after being 26–6 down at half-time. (BBC)

=== 3 February 2005 (Thursday) ===
- A National Hockey League team owner, requesting anonymity, expects the league to cancel the season after labor negotiations have gone nowhere for weeks. (AP/Yahoo!)
- Basketball: Ashley McElhiney announced that she is staying on as head coach of the ABA Nashville Rhythm. This decision came after the announcement of her firing by the team's co-owner courtside during a game on Saturday. (AP/Yahoo!)
- National Football League: Legendary running back Emmitt Smith announces his retirement from the sport. Smith racked up 18,355 rushing yards and scored 164 touchdowns during his remarkable career. (AP/Yahoo!)
- Doping, cross-country skiing: French skier Vincent Vittoz, currently ranked No. 2 in the XC skiing World Cup season, submits a positive drug test on the banned diuretic furosemide. Part B of the test process will remove any doubts as to whether the drug was actually taken or not. (AP/Skiracing.com) Update: Vittoz cleared of charges; see 9 February.
- Football (soccer): UEFA announces that clubs competing in the Champions League and UEFA Cup will have to include four 'homegrown' players in their 25-man squad from 2006. (BBC) UEFA also confirm that they have signed a memorandum of understanding with leading betting exchange Betfair in an effort to curb match fixing. (Soccer365)
- Formula One: The Jordan team confirmed that Tiago Monteiro and Narain Karthikeyan would drive for them in the 2005 season. (JordanF1.com)

=== 2 February 2005 (Wednesday) ===
- National Basketball Association (NBA):
  - Rudy Tomjanovich steps down as head coach of the Los Angeles Lakers, citing health reasons. (AP/Yahoo!)
  - Boston Celtics 110, New Jersey Nets 86 in Boston. (NBA)
  - Houston Rockets 118, Philadelphia 76ers 95 in Philadelphia. (NBA)
  - Toronto Raptors 98, Indiana Pacers 97 in Indianapolis. (NBA)
  - Detroit Pistons 99, Atlanta Hawks 84 in Auburn Hills, Michigan. (NBA)
  - Phoenix Suns 108, Minnesota Timberwolves 79 in Minneapolis. (NBA)
  - Dallas Mavericks 90, New Orleans Hornets 82 in New Orleans. (NBA)
  - Portland Trail Blazers 97, Denver Nuggets 92 in Portland. (NBA)
  - Sacramento Kings 111, Golden State Warriors 107 in overtime in Oakland. (NBA)
- Cricket: South Africa (270 for 8) tie with England (270 for 5) in a dramatic conclusion to the second One Day International at Bloemfontein. (BBC)
- Football: Prosecutors in Berlin have confirmed that police raided the premises of 19 suspects in the ongoing German match fixing scandal and found information that may implicate as many as 25 people in fixing ten matches in 2004 alone. In addition to disgraced referee and admitted fixer Robert Hoyzer, 14 players and three referees are suspected of involvement. The three Hertha BSC Berlin players previously linked to the scandal have been cleared. (AFP/Yahoo!)

=== 1 February 2005 (Tuesday) ===
- Doping: Scientists at the World Anti-Doping Agency (WADA) have discovered a new designer steroid, called Desoxy-Methyl Testosterone, or DMT, which has the ability to increase strength, muscle bulk and stamina. The steroid appears to be a new generation of tetrahydrogestrinone (THG), but is much more sophisticated than any previously discovered steroid for doping use. (CBC Sports)
- Football: Ten countries have submitted eight bids to UEFA to host the 2012 European Football Championship finals. They are joint bids from Poland-Ukraine, Croatia-Hungary, and individual bids from Greece, Italy, Romania, Russia, Turkey, and Azerbaijan. Candidate bids have to submit their dossiers to UEFA by 21 July; a shortlist of three candidacies will be chosen in November, and the successful bid will be chosen in December 2006. The 2008 finals will be held in Austria and Switzerland. (Reuters).
- Cricket: Pakistan (307 for 8) beat the West Indies (277) by 30 runs to win a place in the final of the VB Series against Australia. (BBC)
