= Sportradar US =

- Formerly: SportsData
- Company type: Private
- Headquarters: Minneapolis
- Parent: Sportradar AG
- Website: sportradar.us

Sportradar US, formerly SportsData, LLC, is the US branch of Sportradar. Based in Minneapolis, Sportradar US captures live play-by-play data and delivers it in real-time to companies in media, technology and fantasy sports. Its clients include Google, Bleacher Report, Facebook, Twitter and the Pac-12 Conference. They have writers and editors who attend games, watch broadcasts and survey media to gather relevant news related to sports. Coverage includes injuries, in-game information, breaking news from existing media and internet outlets.

== History ==
On December 2, 2013, SportsData announced its acquisition by Sportradar and rebranded to Sportradar US. They host coverage for 40 sports, 800 leagues and 200,000 events. Sportradar is headquartered in St. Gallen (Switzerland) and also has offices in: Trondheim, Oslo, Stockholm, London, Paris, Barcelona, Munich, Gera, Bremen, Hamburg, Linz, Vienna, Zlín, Ljubljana, Tallinn, Moscow, Durban, Hong Kong, Montevideo, Usk, New York City, Sarasota, Minneapolis, Buenos Aires, Istanbul, Athens, Rome, Beijing, Singapore and Kyiv.

On February 11, 2015, NASCAR signed a deal granting SportsData rights to distribute data. NASCAR previously held statistics in house available to fans only from their official website.

On April 20, 2015, Sportradar US becomes NFL's exclusive statistics distribution partner

On September 29, 2015, also NHL choose Sportradar as their distribution partner.

On October 27, 2015, Ted Leonsis, Mark Cuban and Michael Jordan, led by Revolution Growth, invest $44 Million in Sportradar US' parent company.
