= NSoft =

Software development company

NSoft d.o.o. Mostar
- Formerly: NeoSoft d.o.o. Mostar
- Type: Private
- Industry: Software
- Founded: 2008; 18 years ago
- Founder: Igor Krezić
- Headquarters: Mostar, Bosnia and Herzegovina
- Products: Sportsbook platform, virtual games, draw-based games, numbers betting, AI video management system
- Number of employees: 300+

NSoft d.o.o. Mostar is a business-to-business software development company based in Mostar, Bosnia and Herzegovina with clients from over 35 countries. NSoft is also a member of Bit Alliance, a non-government organization that gathers IT companies from Bosnia and Herzegovina. The company employs over 300 people. The main activity is software development and custom software for bookmakers and gaming industry, including inhouse development of virtual games and draw-based games. The company is also engaged in the development of software for video management system. Their AI-based software for surveillance is called Vision.

== Business results ==
NSoft has been included in the Deloitte Fast 50 CE and Deloitte Fast 500 EMEA rankings, which recognize companies based on revenue growth over a five-year period.

Between 2017 and 2019, the company reported steady revenue growth, while net profit declined toward the end of the period. Revenue in 2019 amounted to 24.95 million BAM (12.76 million EUR) with the recorded net profit of 2.51 million BAM (1.28 million EUR). In comparative analyses of IT companies in Bosnia and Herzegovina, NSoft ranked among the leading firms by net income and net profit.

In 2018 The Foreign Investment Promotion Agency of BiH (FIPA) (State Agency from Bosnia and Herzegovina) has put NSoft on its “The Most Significant Investor in BiH” list together with 11 more companies from different industries.
