= Mobile TV format =

Standards for live TV on mobile devices

Mobile TV Format is a colloquial and collective name for technology standards set out for broadcasting TV services to mobile devices, mostly mobile handsets for now. Currently, there are four prevalent formats known as DMB, DVB-H, OneSeg and MediaFLO. As of December 2007, ITU approved T-DMB, DVB-H, OneSeg and MediaFLO as the global standard for real-time mobile video and audio broadcasting. Thus far, none of the four formats has secured a dominant position in the global market, except in their respective home markets.

== History ==
Samsung and LG were the first to tout new generation mobile phones that would allow users to watch live multi-channel TV on the move during International Broadcasting Convention (IBC) in Amsterdam in September 2005. South Korea's top mobile operator SK Telecom launched a satellite pay-TV service to mobile phones in South Korea in May 2005. The Korean handset makers' push into the European Mobile TV market was soon to be met by strong competition, particularly from Nokia, while the Korean handset makers were looking forward to the 2006 World Cup soccer game in Germany as a crucial launch pad.

== Market Developments ==
South Korea's DMB made a head start in May 2005, but European Union advocates for a single standard and has officially endorsed Nokia's DVB-H. In the US, however, Qualcomm's MediaFLO has got the upper hand for now. Japan is developing its own standard. Journalists and market analyzers are currently taking widely split views about the future course of mobile TV format wars.

"We see DVB-H winning out over all, but there will also be limited space for some of the other technologies," said Adrian Drozd, a London-based senior analyst with Datamonitor. "DMB has a head start, but from 2007 onward DVB-H should get momentum and become the dominant technology."

Which format is going to be an ultimate winner in the end is less important than when mobile TV will grow out of its infancy to be a prime pastime for mobile handset users globally. For instance, five-channel Virgin Mobile TV (VMTV) was launched in UK in October 2006, based on DMB technology with a £2.5m advertising campaign. But it failed to take off with customers, and in July 2007 VMTV has reached a decision to dump its mobile TV service.

Speaking about Virgin's decision to dump its mobile TV service, Bruce Renny, marketing director at mobile TV group ROK Entertainment Group, said expectations of the commercial take-up of broadcast mobile TV had been "over-optimistic, and the demise of Virgin's mobile TV service reflects that".

"After all, why pay a subscription fee to receive the same TV content on your mobile that you already get at home? Particularly when people don't watch TV on mobiles for more than a few minutes at a time.

"Most mobile TV viewing is for just a few minutes. To be commercially successful, you have to provide a combination of live news, sports updates and video-on-demand made-for-mobile content which is instantly engaging. Simply broadcasting linear TV to mobiles is not the answer," he said.

Contrary to the above-mentioned failure, however, South Korea seems to be on the right track. As of February 2006, Satellite DMB(S-DMB) subscribers came to 440,000 since the service launch in May 2005, while the number of Terrestrial DMB (T-DMB) subscribers reached 110,000 since the service launch in December 2005. As of December 2007, South Korea is the only country where T-DMB is widely deployed. More than 7 million handsets, laptops, car navigators and other gadgets that are equipped with T-DMB receivers are in use. USB-type receivers are being sold at around 50,000 won ($50). It is being tested in 11 other nations including Germany, Italy, France, Britain and China. Nevertheless, both T-DMB and S-DMB have not garnered decent profits so far.
