= 2005 German football match-fixing scandal =

Sports scandal in Germany

In early 2005, German football was overshadowed by the discovery of a €2 million match fixing scandal centred on second division referee Robert Hoyzer, who confessed to fixing and betting on matches in the 2. Bundesliga, the DFB-Pokal (German Cup), and the then third division Regionalliga. The scandal has been described as the largest controversy in German football since the Bundesliga scandal of the early 1970s, as numerous players, coaches and officials have been accused of involvement with an organised crime group in the scheme, which came on the eve of Germany playing host to the 2006 World Cup.

Although it does not appear that any Bundesliga games were involved, the matches in question included a DFB Cup first-round contest between regional side SC Paderborn and Bundesliga heavyweights Hamburger SV played on 21 August 2004. Hamburg lost 2–4 as two highly questionable penalties were awarded to Paderborn and Hamburg footballer Émile Mpenza was sent off for protesting as the club was eliminated from the lucrative competition.

== Overview ==
Four referees – Lutz Michael Fröhlich, Olaf Blumenstein, Manuel Gräfe, and Felix Zwayer – went to officials of the German Football Association (Deutscher Fußball-Bund, DFB) with their suspicions about Robert Hoyzer. Initially, the DFB did not immediately act, but after becoming aware of the accusations, Hoyzer stepped down from his role as a referee. Indications are that Hoyzer had regular meetings in Berlin with a group of three brothers who were part of a Croatian gambling syndicate connected to an organized crime group. After a confession from Hoyzer, several suspects were put under surveillance and on 28 January 2005 a number of people were arrested. Milan Šapina, operator of the Café King sports betting agency and his brother Philip were taken into custody, along with Hertha BSC players Alexander Madlung, Nando Rafael, and Josip Šimunić. Madlung, Rafael, and Šimunić all played in Hertha's surprising 3–2 defeat to third-division side Eintracht Braunschweig in their 22 September 2004 German Cup match, with Madlung giving up a crucial 80th minute own goal, only four minutes after coming on as a substitute. The trio came under suspicion for having been known to associate with the Šapina brothers, but there has been no proof that they actually participated in the manipulation of this or any other match.

As witnesses against Hoyzer, the Berlin referees Lutz Michael Fröhlich and Manuel Gräfe were immediately relieved of their officiating responsibilities for their own safety, being replaced by Franz-Xaver Wack and Thorsten Kinhöfer. The referees scheduled to officiate matches in the 19th round of Bundesliga play on 29 and 30 January 2005 were all changed the day before the games were played. Hoyzer co-operated with investigators in helping to uncover the details of the scheme, implicating other officials, players, and a group of Croatian-based gamblers. This led to an investigation by the league, as well as a criminal investigation. By the end of 2005, it appeared that the scandal did not directly involve the Bundesliga and was confined to lower divisions. The investigations lead to the following results:

- Hoyzer was banned for life from any role in football and received a 2-year-5-month prison sentence. Jail sentences for Hoyzer and five other defendants were confirmed in December 2006 after they had lost their final appeals in court.
- Referee Dominik Marks was banned for life and received a 1-year-6-month sentence for his involvement.
- The three Croatian brothers orchestrating the scheme received sentences ranging from 2-year-11-month in prison to 1 year – suspended.
- Referee Felix Zwayer was banned for 6 months for his involvement including allegedly accepting a €300 bribe from Hoyzer.
- Referee Torsten Koop received a three-month ban for not promptly reporting an approach from Hoyzer.
- Matches involving officials and players accused or convicted for their involvement in the scheme were subject to review by the league.
- Hamburger SV received compensation worth up to €2 million for its forced early exit from the DFB Cup and compensation for certain other teams affected was arranged.
- After review, replays were ordered for a number of lower division games, while other results were allowed to stand.
- A number of changes have been put in place or proposed to ensure closer oversight of referees and other game officials.
- Once the criminal issues involved have been resolved, it is expected that a number of civil suits will arise as some clubs and individuals seek compensation for harm suffered as a result of the scandal.

== Response of the DFB ==
The DFB-Kontrollausschuss ('DFB Committee of Control') reacted to the scandal with a number of measures intended to prevent similar incidents in the future:

- The committee originally intended to follow the UEFA practice of designating game officials on just two days' notice before the match, rather than on the existing schedule of four days' notice. This suggestion was abandoned as impractical.
- Referees who are promoted to officiate in second-division games will first be observed over a three-year period in the Regionalliga.
- Previously, matches involving Bundesliga teams in the German Cup had not been subject to observation by an arbitrator, but will be in the future. This fourth official will be certified for first division matches and able to act as a substitute game official on short notice if required.
- Substitutions may be made for the two junior game officials on the day of the match at the direction of league officials.
- Video replays will be used more extensively in future.
- Where a potential problem has been identified with game officials, all those involved may be subject to an immediate interim suspension under the "Betradar" early warning system until the issue is resolved.
- The DFB is proposing to offer its own sports betting program for the league in 2006–'07 in order to have some control and oversight of the popular and lucrative sideline.
- There is some consideration of responsibility for the selection of game officials being put into the hands of the DFL (Deutsche Fußball Liga or German Football League), the governing body responsible for all of German football, rather than leaving this to the control of individual leagues.

These measures are regarded as an immediate first step taken to manage the problem of match-fixing. Other more detailed proposals will be put forward by an expert committee appointed to address the issue. On 13 February 2005, the DFB announced the Ausschuss für das Problem Spielmanipulationen ('Commission for the Problem of Match Manipulation') as being made up of DFB President Zwanziger, DFL President Hackmann, Treasurer Schmidhuber, and Secretary General Horst Schmidt.

The DFL is also considering a departure from tradition by employing professional officials in place of the amateurs now used. DFL President Werner Hackmann sees the controversial step as possible in light of the recent scandal. The former chairman of the board of Hamburger SV feels that the use of full-time referees earning a good wage could help deflect bribery attempts in the future. Former star player and head of Germany's 2006 FIFA World Cup Organizing Committee Franz Beckenbauer expressed opposition to the idea of employing professional officials feeling that the current system has worked quite well and is solidly supported by the excellent training program run by the DFB. The former FIFA referee Hellmut Krug, DFB Director of Officials (Schiedsrichterabteilung), criticised the control system the DFB had in place because it had been known for some time that Hoyzer was making dubious decisions, but there was no action taken. He also emphasised the more general need for observers to prepare written match reports as is the practise for all Bundesliga matches.

== The scandal and the 2006 World Cup ==
There was some fear that the scandal affecting the largest football association in the world could have some negative impact on the upcoming World Cup to be hosted by Germany in 2006. While World Cup Organising Committee chief Franz Beckenbauer expressed his concern, government spokesman Thomas Steg acknowledged the efforts of the DFB in acting in a committed manner in quickly dealing with the issue. A spokesman for Germany's Ministry of the Interior warned against an atmosphere of general suspicion and exaggerated mistrust given what appeared to be, on investigation, the narrow scope of the problem. It was felt that the response to the scandal by the DFB demonstrated the general effectiveness of the sport's governing institutions. Interior Minister Otto Schily also encouraged all game officials to support the DFB and public prosecutor's office in quickly addressing any suspicions raised. He indicated that it was clear that the vast majority of officials conduct themselves in an honest and professional manner and that to be generally suspicious of the game's officials without cause would be unfair.

The scandal attracted international media attention, but DFB and FIFA worked aggressively to ensure that the controversy died down before the 2006 World Cup.

== Affected matches ==
In the course of the investigation by the DFB a number of matches were examined to determine if there was an attempt to manipulate them and if any such attempt had affected the outcome. The matches and their relevant detail are listed below in chronological order. The DFB set a cut off date of 30 June 2005 for filing protests over matches that may have been subject to attempted manipulation. While Hoyzer had drawn the suspicion of a number of his fellow officials sometime earlier, it was the 21 August 2004 match between SC Paderborn 07 and Hamburger SV that precipitated the complaint to the DFB against him.

- 30 May 2004 Wuppertaler SV – Werder Bremen Amateure 1–0

This Regionalliga Nord match was refereed by Hoyzer. There was no determination of manipulation. Bremen did not file a protest as the result did not materially affect their standing in the league table. The match was not replayed and the result left to stand.

- 5 June 2004 Eintracht Braunschweig – FC St. Pauli 3–2

This Regionalliga Nord match was refereed by Hoyzer. There was a determination of manipulation, but because the season was completed by the time the determination was made the match was not replayed and the result left to stand. Negotiations were initiated to arrange compensation for St. Pauli.

- 11 August 2004 VfL Wolfsburg Amateure – Fortuna Düsseldorf 1–1

This Regionalliga Nord match was refereed by Hoyzer. There was no determination of manipulation. The match was not replayed and the result left to stand.

- 13 August 2004 Hertha BSC Amateure – Arminia Bielefeld Amateure 2–1

This Regionalliga Nord match was refereed by Dominik Marks. Hoyzer testified that Marks received payment to attempt to manipulate the outcome. The contest was replayed near the end of the season on 12 April 2005 with Berlin repeating their victory, this time by a score of 6:0. No other compensation was ordered.

- 14 August 2004 FC St. Pauli – VfL Osnabrück 2–3

This Regionalliga Nord match was refereed by Hoyzer. There was no determination of manipulation. The match was not replayed and the result left to stand.

- 21 August 2004 SC Paderborn 07 – Hamburger SV 4–2

This opening round German Cup match was refereed by Hoyzer who admitted to attempting to influence the outcome of the game by awarding a number of unjustified penalties against Hamburg. HSV striker Emile Mpenza was sent off for protesting calls. The obviously questionable nature of the calls in this match caused a number of Hoyzer's fellow officials to complain to the German Football Association which led to the opening of the investigations that revealed the scandal.

By the time the fix was revealed several more Cup rounds had been played and Paderborn had been eliminated. The match was not to be replayed and Mpenza's red card was rescinded. HSV was awarded €500,000 in compensation and was also to be awarded a Germany international match at the club's home ground which could generate an additional €1.5 million in revenue.

- 27 August 2004 Rot-Weiss Essen – FC Rot-Weiß Erfurt 0–0

This 2. Bundesliga match was refereed by Hoyzer. There was no determination of manipulation. The match was not replayed and the result left to stand.

- 21 September 2004 1. FC Nürnberg – LR Ahlen 2–3

This opening round German Cup match was refereed by Hoyzer. There was no determination of manipulation. The match was not replayed and the result left to stand.

- 26 September 2004 MSV Duisburg – SpVgg Greuther Fürth 1–0

This 2. Bundesliga match was refereed by Hoyzer and a protest was filed by Fürth. It was determined that there was an attempt to manipulate the match, but that the attempt did not affect the outcome. The match was not replayed and the result left to stand.

- 22 October 2004 LR Ahlen – SV Wacker Burghausen 1–0

This 2. Bundesliga match was refereed by Hoyzer who admitted to manipulating the match by awarding Ahlen a questionable penalty. The match was replayed near the end of the season on 27 April 2005 with Burghausen able to reverse the result with a 3–1 win. The outcome did not otherwise materially affect the standing of the two clubs in the league table. No other compensation was ordered.

- 6 November 2004 KFC Uerdingen 05 – VfL Osnabrück 1–4

This Regionalliga Nord match was refereed by Hoyzer. There was no determination of manipulation. The match was not replayed and the result left to stand.

- 28 November 2004 SpVgg Unterhaching – 1. FC Saarbrücken 1–3

This 2. Bundesliga match was refereed by Hoyzer who admitted to manipulating the game by awarding Unterhaching a questionable penalty. The penalty which could have tied the match at 2–2 was missed. The attempt to manipulate the game did not affect its outcome and the result was left to stand. No other compensation was ordered.

- 3 December 2004 Karlsruher SC – MSV Duisburg 0–3

This 2. Bundesliga was refereed by Dominik Marks. Hoyzer testified that Marks received payment to attempt to manipulate the outcome. KSC filed a protest over the result. While it was determined that there was an attempt to manipulate the match, it was judged that the attempt did not affect the outcome. The match was not replayed and the result left to stand.
