= 2000 United States presidential election =

Election of George W. Bush

- November 7, 2000

538 members of the Electoral College 270 electoral votes needed to win
- Opinion polls
- Turnout: 54.2% (▲2.5 pp)

Nominee	George W. Bush	Al Gore
Party	Republican	Democratic
Home state	Texas	Tennessee
Running mate	Dick Cheney	Joe Lieberman
Electoral vote	271	266 (Note: 267 electors pledged to the Gore/Lieberman ticket were elected; however, an elector from the District of Columbia cast a blank ballot for president and vice president, bringing the ticket's total number of electoral votes to 266.)
States carried	30	20 + DC
Popular vote	50,456,002	50,999,897
Percentage	47.9%	48.4%
- Presidential election results map. Red denotes states won by Bush/Cheney and blue denotes those won by Gore/Lieberman. Numbers indicate electoral votes cast by each state and the District of Columbia. One of D.C.'s three electors cast a blank ballot for president and vice president.
President before election
Bill Clinton
Democratic
Elected President
George W. Bush
Republican

A presidential election was held in the United States on November 7, 2000. The Republican ticket of Texas governor George W. Bush and former secretary of defense Dick Cheney narrowly defeated the Democratic ticket of incumbent vice president Al Gore and Connecticut junior senator Joe Lieberman. It was the fourth of five U.S. presidential elections, and the first since 1888, in which the winning candidate lost the popular vote. By number of votes that could have changed the outcome, it is the closest presidential election in U.S. history. The result remains controversial.

Incumbent Democratic president Bill Clinton was ineligible to run for a third term due to term limits established by the Twenty-second Amendment to the United States Constitution. Incumbent vice president Gore easily secured the Democratic nomination, defeating former New Jersey senator Bill Bradley in the primaries. He selected Connecticut senator Joe Lieberman as his running mate. Bush—the eldest son of former president George H. W. Bush—was seen as the early favorite for the Republican nomination, and after a contentious primary battle with Arizona senator John McCain and others, he secured the nomination by Super Tuesday. He selected former secretary of defense Dick Cheney as his running mate.

Both major-party candidates focused primarily on domestic issues, such as the budget, tax relief, and reforms for federal social insurance programs, although foreign policy was not ignored. Due to President Clinton's sex scandal with Monica Lewinsky and subsequent impeachment, Gore avoided campaigning with Clinton. Republicans denounced Clinton's indiscretions, while Gore criticized Bush's lack of experience.

On election night, it was unclear who had won, with the electoral votes of the state of Florida still undecided. It took over a month to resolve the issue: recounts were started and halted (some due to protest), and ensuing litigation was settled by the highly controversial U.S. Supreme Court decision Bush v. Gore, which ensured that Florida's electoral votes went to Bush, tipping the election in his favor. Without a full recount, Bush carried Florida by only 537 votes out of 5.96 million cast in the state (a margin of 0.009%).

Ultimately, Bush won 271 electoral votes, one vote more than the 270 required to win, while Gore won the popular vote by 543,895 votes (a margin of 0.52% of all votes cast). Bush flipped 11 states that had voted Democratic in 1996: Arkansas, Arizona, Florida, Kentucky, Louisiana, Missouri, Nevada, New Hampshire, Ohio, Tennessee, and West Virginia. Despite Gore's loss, this election marked the first time since 1948 that the Democratic Party won the popular vote in three consecutive elections.

== Background ==
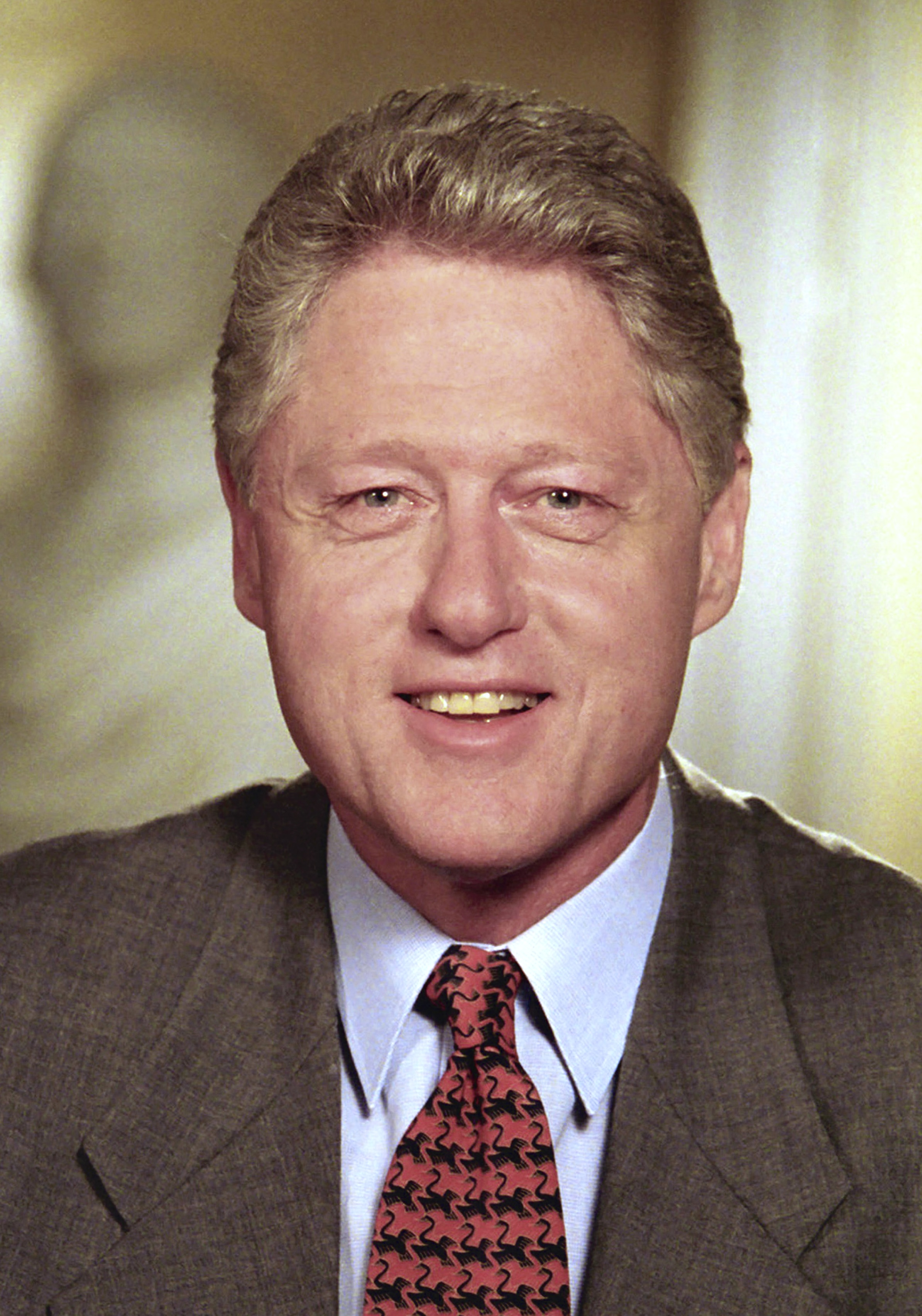
Bill Clinton, the incumbent president in 2000, whose second term expired at noon on January 20, 2001

President Bill Clinton, a Democrat and former governor of Arkansas, was ineligible to seek reelection to a third term due to the Twenty-second Amendment; in accordance with Section 1 of the Twentieth Amendment, his term expired at noon Eastern Standard Time on January 20, 2001.

== Nominations ==
=== Republican Party ===
Republican Party (United States) 2000 Republican Party ticket
George W. Bush	Dick Cheney
for President	for Vice President
46th Governor of Texas (1995–2000)	17th U.S. Secretary of Defense (1989–1993)
Campaign

==== Candidates ====
Candidates in this section are sorted by popular vote from the primaries
John McCain	Alan Keyes	Steve Forbes	Gary Bauer	Orrin Hatch	Elizabeth Dole	Pat Buchanan
U.S. Senator from Arizona (1987–2018)	Asst. Secretary of State (1985–1987)	Businessman	U.S. Under Secretary of Education (1985–1987)	U.S. Senator from Utah (1977–2019)	U.S. Secretary of Labor (1989–1990)	White House Communications Director (1985–1987)
Campaign	Campaign	Campaign	Campaign	Campaign	Campaign	Campaign
W: March 9; 6,457,696 votes	W: July 25; 1,009,232 votes	W: Feb 10; 151,362 votes	W: Feb 4; 65,128 votes	W: Jan 26; 20,408 votes	W: Oct 20 231 votes	W: Oct 25; Ran for the Reform Party nomination 0 votes

==== Primaries ====
Bush became the early front-runner, acquiring unprecedented funding and a broad base of leadership support based on his governorship of Texas, the Bush family's name recognition, and connections in American politics. Former cabinet member George Shultz played an important early role in securing establishment Republican support for Bush. In April 1998, he invited Bush to discuss policy issues with experts including Michael Boskin, John Taylor, and Condoleezza Rice, who later became his secretary of state. The group, which was "looking for a candidate for 2000 with good political instincts, someone they could work with", was impressed, and Shultz encouraged him to enter the race.

Several aspirants withdrew before the Iowa caucuses because they did not secure funding and endorsements sufficient to remain competitive with Bush. These included Elizabeth Dole, Dan Quayle, Lamar Alexander, and Bob Smith. Pat Buchanan dropped out to run for the Reform Party nomination. That left Bush, John McCain, Alan Keyes, Steve Forbes, Gary Bauer, and Orrin Hatch as the only candidates still in the race.

On January 24, Bush won the Iowa caucuses with 41% of the vote. Forbes came in second with 30% of the vote. Keyes received 14%, Bauer 9%, McCain 5%, and Hatch 1%. Two days later, Hatch dropped out and endorsed Bush. The national media portrayed Bush as the establishment candidate.

With the support of many moderate Republicans and independents, McCain portrayed himself as a crusading insurgent who focused on campaign reform.

On February 1, McCain, who had skipped the caucuses in order to divert resources toward New Hampshire and South Carolina, won a surprising 49–30% victory over Bush in the New Hampshire primary. Bauer subsequently dropped out, followed by Forbes, who had won no primaries after spending $32 million of his own money on his campaign. This left three candidates. In the South Carolina primary, Bush soundly defeated McCain. Some McCain supporters accused the Bush campaign of mudslinging and negative campaigning, citing push polls that implied that McCain's adopted Bangladeshi-born daughter was an African-American child he fathered out of wedlock. McCain's loss in South Carolina damaged his campaign, but he won both Michigan and his home state of Arizona on February 22.

The primary campaigns impacted the South Carolina State House, where a controversy about the Confederate flag flying over the capitol dome prompted the state legislature to move the flag to a less prominent position at a Civil War memorial on the capitol grounds. Most GOP candidates said the issue should be left to South Carolina voters, but McCain later recanted and said the flag should be removed.

McCain criticized Bush for speaking at and accepting the endorsement of Bob Jones University despite its policy banning interracial dating, actions for which Bush subsequently apologized. On February 28, McCain also referred to Jerry Falwell and televangelist Pat Robertson as "agents of intolerance," a term from which he distanced himself during his 2008 bid. He lost Virginia to Bush on February 29. On Super Tuesday, March 7, Bush won New York, Ohio, Georgia, Missouri, California, Maryland, and Maine. McCain won Rhode Island, Vermont, Connecticut, and Massachusetts but dropped out of the race. Bush took the majority of the remaining contests and won the Republican nomination on March 14, winning his home state of Texas and his brother Jeb's home state of Florida, among others. At the Republican National Convention in Philadelphia, Bush accepted the nomination.

Bush asked former secretary of defense Dick Cheney to head up a team to help select a running mate for him, but ultimately chose Cheney himself as the vice presidential nominee. While the U.S. Constitution does not specifically disallow a president and a vice president from the same state, it prohibits electors from casting both of their votes for persons from their own state. Accordingly, Cheney—who had been a resident of Texas for nearly 10 years—changed his voting registration back to Wyoming. Had Cheney not done this, either he or Bush would have forfeited his electoral votes from Texas.

=== Democratic Party ===
Democratic Party (United States) 2000 Democratic Party ticket
Al Gore	Joe Lieberman
for President	for Vice President
45th Vice President of the United States (1993–2001)	U.S. Senator from Connecticut (1989–2013)
Campaign

==== Candidates ====
Bill Bradley

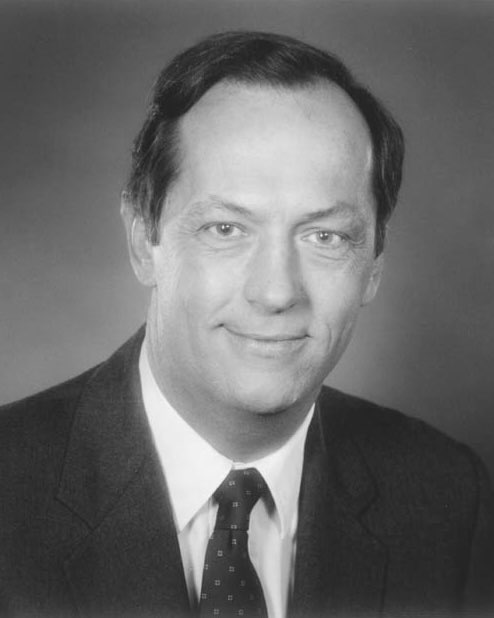

U.S. Senator
from New Jersey
(1979–1997)

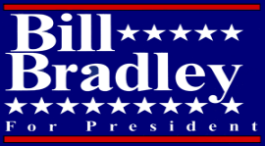

Campaign
W: March 9
3,027,912 votes

==== Primaries ====
Vice President Al Gore was a consistent front-runner for the nomination. Other prominent Democrats mentioned as possible contenders included Bob Kerrey, Missouri Representative Dick Gephardt, Minnesota Senator Paul Wellstone, and actor and director Warren Beatty. Of these, only Wellstone formed an exploratory committee.

Running an insurgency campaign, U.S. Senator Bill Bradley positioned himself as the alternative to Gore, who was a founding member of the centrist Democratic Leadership Council. While former basketball star Michael Jordan campaigned for him in the early primary states, Bradley announced his intention to campaign "in a different way" by conducting a positive campaign of "big ideas." His campaign's focus was a plan to spend the record-breaking budget surplus on a variety of social welfare programs to help the poor and the middle class, along with campaign finance reform and gun control.

Gore easily defeated Bradley in the primaries, largely because of support from the Democratic Party establishment and Bradley's poor showing in the Iowa caucus, where Gore successfully painted Bradley as aloof and indifferent to the plight of farmers. The closest Bradley came to a victory was his 50–46 loss to Gore in the New Hampshire primary. On March 14, Gore clinched the Democratic nomination.

None of Bradley's delegates were allowed to vote for him, so Gore won the nomination unanimously at the Democratic National Convention. Connecticut Senator Joe Lieberman was nominated for vice president by voice vote. Lieberman became the first Jewish American ever to be chosen for this position by a major party. Gore chose Lieberman over five other finalists: Senators Evan Bayh, John Edwards, and John Kerry, House Minority Leader Dick Gephardt, and New Hampshire Governor Jeanne Shaheen.

=== Third-party and independent candidates ===
After Ross Perot's large turnout in the 1996 presidential election, third-party candidates were still able to gather some significant media attention.

==== Association of State Green Parties nomination ====
2000 Association of State Green Parties ticket
Ralph Nader	Winona LaDuke
for President	for Vice President
Founder of Public Citizen	Activist from Minnesota

- Green Party candidates:
  - Ralph Nader from Connecticut – 295
  - Jello Biafra from California – 10
  - Stephen Gaskin from Tennessee – 11
  - Joel Kovel from New York – 3
  - Abstain – 1

The Greens/Green Party USA, a then-recognized national party organization, later endorsed Nader for president and he appeared on the ballots of 43 states and Washington, D.C.

==== Reform Party nomination ====
2000 Reform Party ticket
Pat Buchanan	Ezola Foster
for President	for Vice President
White House Communications Director (1985–1987)	Conservative political activist from California

===== Candidates =====
Candidates in this section are sorted by date of withdrawal from the primaries
John Hagelin	Donald Trump
Physicist from Iowa	Chairman of The Trump Organization (1971–2017)
Campaign	Campaign
LN: July 01, 2000; 28,539 votes	W: February 14, 2000; 0 votes

The nomination went to Pat Buchanan and running mate Ezola Foster from California over the objections of party founder Ross Perot and despite a rump convention nomination of John Hagelin by the Perot faction. In the end, the Federal Election Commission sided with Buchanan, and that ticket appeared on 49 of 51 possible ballots.

==== Libertarian Party nomination ====
2000 Libertarian Party ticket
Harry Browne	Art Olivier
for President	for Vice President
Writer from Tennessee	Mayor of Bellflower, California (1998–1999)

- Libertarian Party candidates delegate totals:
  - Harry Browne from Tennessee – 493
  - Don Gorman from New Hampshire – 166
  - Jacob Hornberger from Virginia – 120
  - Barry Hess from Arizona – 53
  - None of the Above – 23
  - Other write-ins – 15
  - David Hollist from California – 8

The Libertarian Party's National Nominating Convention nominated Harry Browne from Tennessee and Art Olivier from California for president and vice president. Browne was nominated on the first ballot and Olivier received the vice presidential nomination on the second ballot. Browne appeared on every state ballot except Arizona's, due to a dispute between the Libertarian Party of Arizona (which instead nominated L. Neil Smith) and the national Libertarian Party.

==== Constitution Party nomination ====
- Constitution Party candidates:
  - Howard Phillips
  - Herb Titus
  - Mathew Zupan
  - Bob Smith, U.S. senator from New Hampshire (1990–2003)
    Member of the U.S. House of Representatives from NH-01 (1985–1990) Withdrew: August 17, 1999

The Constitution Party nominated Howard Phillips from Virginia for a third time and Curtis Frazier from Missouri. It was on the ballot in 41 states.

==== Natural Law Party nomination ====
- John Hagelin from Iowa and Nat Goldhaber from California

The Natural Law Party held its national convention in Arlington County, Virginia, on August 31–September 2, unanimously nominating a ticket of Hagelin/Goldhaber without a roll-call vote. The party was on 38 of the 51 ballots nationally.

==== Independents ====
- Bob Smith U.S. senator from New Hampshire (1990–2003)
  Member of the U.S. House of Representatives from NH-01 (1985–1990) Withdrew: October 28, 1999

== General election campaign ==
The US economy was enjoying record prosperity in the late 1990s. Although the campaign focused mainly on domestic issues, such as the projected budget surplus, proposed reforms of Social Security and Medicare, health care, and competing plans for tax relief, foreign policy was a prominent issue.

Bush criticized the Clinton administration's policies in Somalia, where 18 Americans died in 1993 intervening among warring factions, and in the Balkans, where United States troops performed a variety of functions. "I don't think our troops ought to be used for what's called nation-building", Bush said in the second presidential debate. Bush also pledged to bridge partisan gaps, claiming the atmosphere in Washington stood in the way of progress on necessary reforms. Gore, meanwhile, questioned Bush's fitness for the job, pointing to gaffes Bush made in interviews and speeches and suggesting he lacked the necessary experience to be president.

Bill Clinton's impeachment and the sex scandal that led up to it cast a shadow on the campaign. Republicans strongly denounced the Clinton scandals, and Bush made a promise to restore "honor and dignity" to the White House a centerpiece of his campaign. Gore studiously avoided the Clinton scandals, as did Lieberman, even though Lieberman had been the first Democratic senator to denounce Clinton's misbehavior. Some observers theorized that Gore chose Lieberman in an attempt to separate himself from Clinton's past misdeeds and help blunt the GOP's attempts to link him to his boss. Others pointed to the passionate kiss Gore gave his wife during the Democratic Convention as a signal that despite the allegations against Clinton, Gore himself was a faithful husband. Gore avoided appearing with Clinton, who was shunted to low-visibility appearances in areas where he was popular. Experts have argued that this could have cost Gore votes from some of Clinton's core supporters.

Ralph Nader was the most successful of the third-party candidates. His campaign was marked by a traveling tour of large "super-rallies" held in sports arenas like Madison Square Garden, with retired talk show host Phil Donahue as master of ceremonies. After initially ignoring Nader, the Gore campaign made a pitch to potential Nader supporters in the campaign's final weeks, downplaying his differences with Nader on the issues and arguing that Gore's ideas were more similar to Nader's than Bush's were and that Gore had a better chance of winning than Nader. On the other side, the Republican Leadership Council ran pro-Nader ads in a few states in an effort to split the liberal vote. Nader said his campaign's objective was to pass the 5-percent threshold so his Green Party would be eligible for matching funds in future races.

Vice-presidential candidates Cheney and Lieberman campaigned aggressively. Both camps made numerous campaign stops nationwide, often just missing each other, such as when Cheney, Hadassah Lieberman, and Tipper Gore attended Chicago's Taste of Polonia over Labor Day Weekend.

=== Presidential debates ===
Debates among candidates for the 2000 U.S. presidential election
No.	Date	Host	City	Moderator	Participants	Viewership (millions)
P1	Tuesday, October 3, 2000	University of Massachusetts Boston	Boston, Massachusetts	Jim Lehrer	Governor George W. Bush; Vice President Al Gore	46.6
VP	Thursday, October 5, 2000	Centre College	Danville, Kentucky	Bernard Shaw	Secretary Dick Cheney; Senator Joe Lieberman	28.5
P2	Wednesday, October 11, 2000	Wake Forest University	Winston-Salem, North Carolina	Jim Lehrer	Governor George W. Bush; Vice President Al Gore	37.5
P3	Tuesday, October 17, 2000	Washington University in St. Louis	St. Louis, Missouri	Jim Lehrer	Governor George W. Bush; Vice President Al Gore	37.7

Sites of the 2000 general election debates

After the 1996 presidential election, the Commission on Presidential Debates set new candidate selection criteria. The new criteria required third-party candidates to poll at least 15% of the vote in national polls in order to take part in the CPD-sponsored presidential debates. Nader was blocked from attending a closed-circuit screening of the first debate despite having a ticket, and barred from attending an interview near the site of the third debate (Washington University in St. Louis) despite having a "perimeter pass". Nader later sued the CPD for its role in the former incident. A settlement was reached that included an apology to him.

=== Notable expressions and phrases ===
- Lockbox/Rainy Day fund: Gore's description of what he would do with the federal budget surplus, which was repeated many times in the first debate.
- Fuzzy math: a term used by Bush to dismiss the figures used by Gore. Others later turned the term against Bush.
- Al Gore invented the Internet: an interpretation of Gore's having said he "took the initiative in creating the Internet," meaning that he was on the committee that funded the research leading to the Internet's formation.
- "Strategery": a phrase uttered by Saturday Night Live's Bush character (portrayed by Will Ferrell), which Bush staffers jokingly picked up to describe their operations.

== Results ==
=== Ballot access ===
Presidential ticket	Party	Ballot access	Votes
Gore / Lieberman	Democratic	50+DC	50,999,897
Bush / Cheney	Republican	50+DC	50,456,002
Nader / LaDuke	Green	43+DC	2,882,955
Buchanan / Foster	Reform	49	448,895
Browne / Olivier	Libertarian	49+DC^{★}	384,431^{★}
Phillips / Frazier	Constitution	41	98,020
Hagelin / Goldhaber	Natural Law	38	83,714

^{★}Although the Libertarian Party had ballot access in all fifty United States plus D.C., Browne's name only appeared on the ballot in forty-nine United States plus D.C. The Libertarian Party of Arizona opted to place L. Neil Smith on the ballot in Browne's place. When adding Smith's 5,775 Arizona votes to Browne's 384,431 votes nationwide, that brings the total presidential votes cast for the Libertarian Party in 2000 to 390,206.

=== Florida recount ===
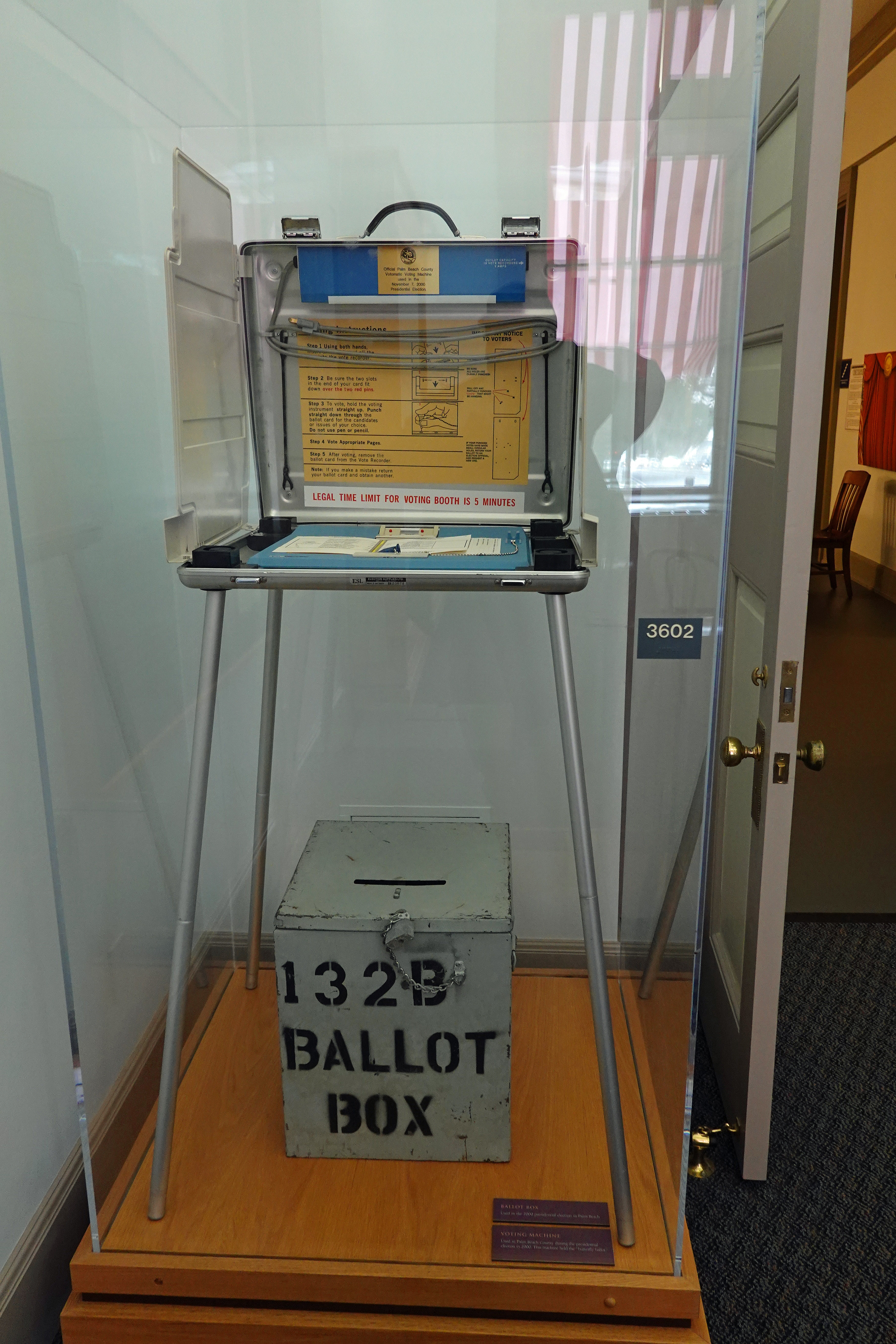
Official Palm Beach County, Florida Votomatic voting machine used in the November 7, 2000 U.S. presidential election, on display at the Florida Historic Capitol Museum, Tallahassee, Florida

On election night, it was unclear who had won, with Florida's electoral votes still undecided. The returns showed that Bush won Florida by such a close margin that state law required a recount. A month-long series of legal battles led to the highly controversial 5–4 U.S. Supreme Court decision Bush v. Gore, which ended the recount with Bush winning Florida by 537 votes, a margin of 0.009%. The Florida recount and subsequent litigation resulted in major post-election controversy, with some analysis suggesting that limited county-based recounts would have confirmed a Bush victory whereas a statewide recount would have given the state to Gore. Post-election analysis found that Palm Beach County's butterfly ballot misdirected over 2,000 votes from Gore to third-party candidate Pat Buchanan, tipping Florida—and the election—to Bush.

With the exceptions of Florida and Gore's home state of Tennessee, Bush carried the Southern states by comfortable margins, including Clinton's home state of Arkansas, and also won Ohio, Indiana, most of the rural Midwestern farming states, most of the Rocky Mountain states, and Alaska. Gore balanced Bush by sweeping the Northeastern United States (with the exception of New Hampshire, which Bush won narrowly), the Pacific Coast states, Hawaii, New Mexico, and most of the Upper Midwest. This was the only presidential election since 1988 where the Republican candidate carried any of the six New England states.

As the night wore on, the returns in a handful of small-to-medium-sized states, including Iowa, Oregon and New Mexico (Gore by 355 votes) were extremely close, but the election came down to Florida. As the final national results were tallied the following morning, Bush had clearly won 246 electoral votes and Gore 249, with 270 needed to win. Two smaller states—Wisconsin (11 electoral votes) and Oregon (7)—were still too close to call, but Florida's 25 electoral votes would be decisive regardless of their results. The election's outcome was not known for more than a month after voting ended because of the time required to count and recount Florida's ballots.

Between 7:50 p.m. and 8:00 p.m. EST on November 7, just before the polls closed in the largely Republican Florida panhandle, which is in the Central time zone, all major television news networks (CNN, NBC, FOX, CBS, and ABC) declared that Gore had won Florida. They based this prediction substantially on exit polls. But in the vote, Bush began to take a wide lead early in Florida, and by 10 p.m. EST, the networks had retracted their predictions and placed Florida back in the "undecided" column. At approximately 2:30 a.m. on November 8, with 85% of the vote counted in Florida and Bush leading Gore by more than 100,000 votes, the networks declared that Bush had carried Florida and therefore been elected president. But most of the remaining votes to be counted in Florida were in three heavily Democratic counties—Broward, Miami-Dade, and Palm Beach—and as their votes were reported Gore began to gain on Bush. By 4:30 a.m., after all votes were counted, Gore had narrowed Bush's margin to under 2,000 votes, and the networks retracted their declarations that Bush had won Florida and the presidency. Gore, who had privately conceded the election to Bush, withdrew his concession. The final result in Florida was slim enough to require a mandatory recount (by machine) under state law; Bush's lead dwindled to just over 300 votes when it was completed the day after the election. On November 8, Florida Division of Elections staff prepared a press release for Florida Secretary of State Katherine Harris that said overseas ballots must be "postmarked or signed and dated" by Election Day. It was never released. A count of the overseas ballots later boosted Bush's margin to 930 votes. According to a report by The New York Times, 680 of the accepted overseas ballots were received after the legal deadline, lacked required postmarks or a witness signature or address, or were unsigned or undated, cast after election day, from unregistered voters or voters not requesting ballots, or double-counted.

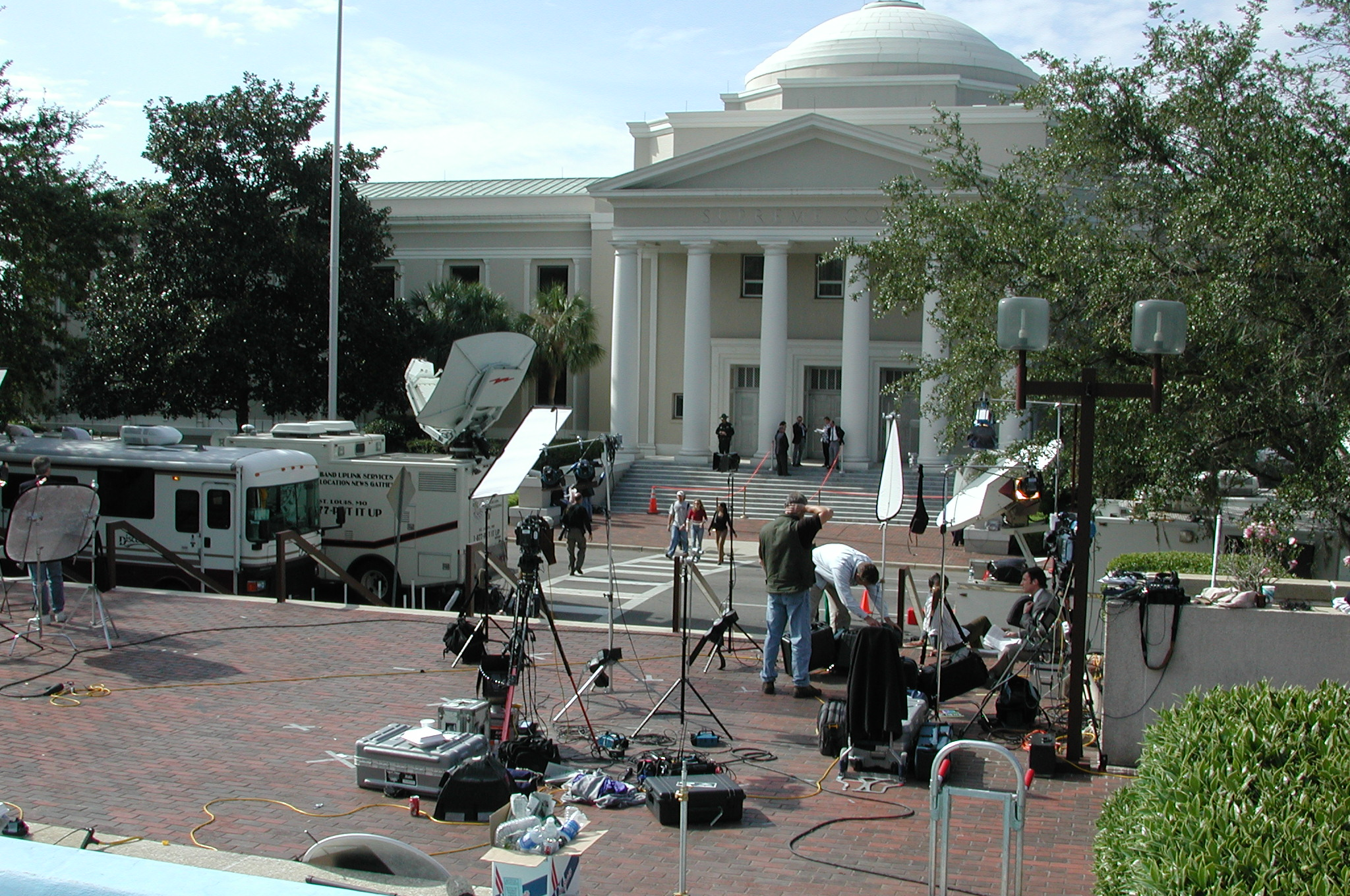
Florida Supreme Court during the recount

Most of the post-electoral controversy revolved around Gore's request for hand recounts in four counties (Broward, Miami-Dade, Palm Beach, and Volusia), as provided under Florida state law. Harris, who also co-chaired Bush's Florida campaign, announced she would reject any revised totals from those counties if they were not turned in by 5 p.m. on November 14, the statutory deadline for amended returns. The Florida Supreme Court extended the deadline to November 26, a decision later vacated by the U.S. Supreme Court. Miami-Dade eventually halted its recount and resubmitted its original total to the state canvassing board, while Palm Beach County failed to meet the extended deadline, turning in its completed recount results at 7 p.m., which Harris rejected. On November 26, the state canvassing board certified Bush as the winner of Florida's electors by 537 votes. Gore formally contested the certified results. A state court decision overruling Gore was reversed by the Florida Supreme Court, which ordered a recount of over 70,000 ballots previously rejected as undervotes by machine counters. The U.S. Supreme Court halted that order the next day, with Justice Scalia issuing a concurring opinion that "the counting of votes that are of questionable legality does in my view threaten irreparable harm to petitioner" (Bush).

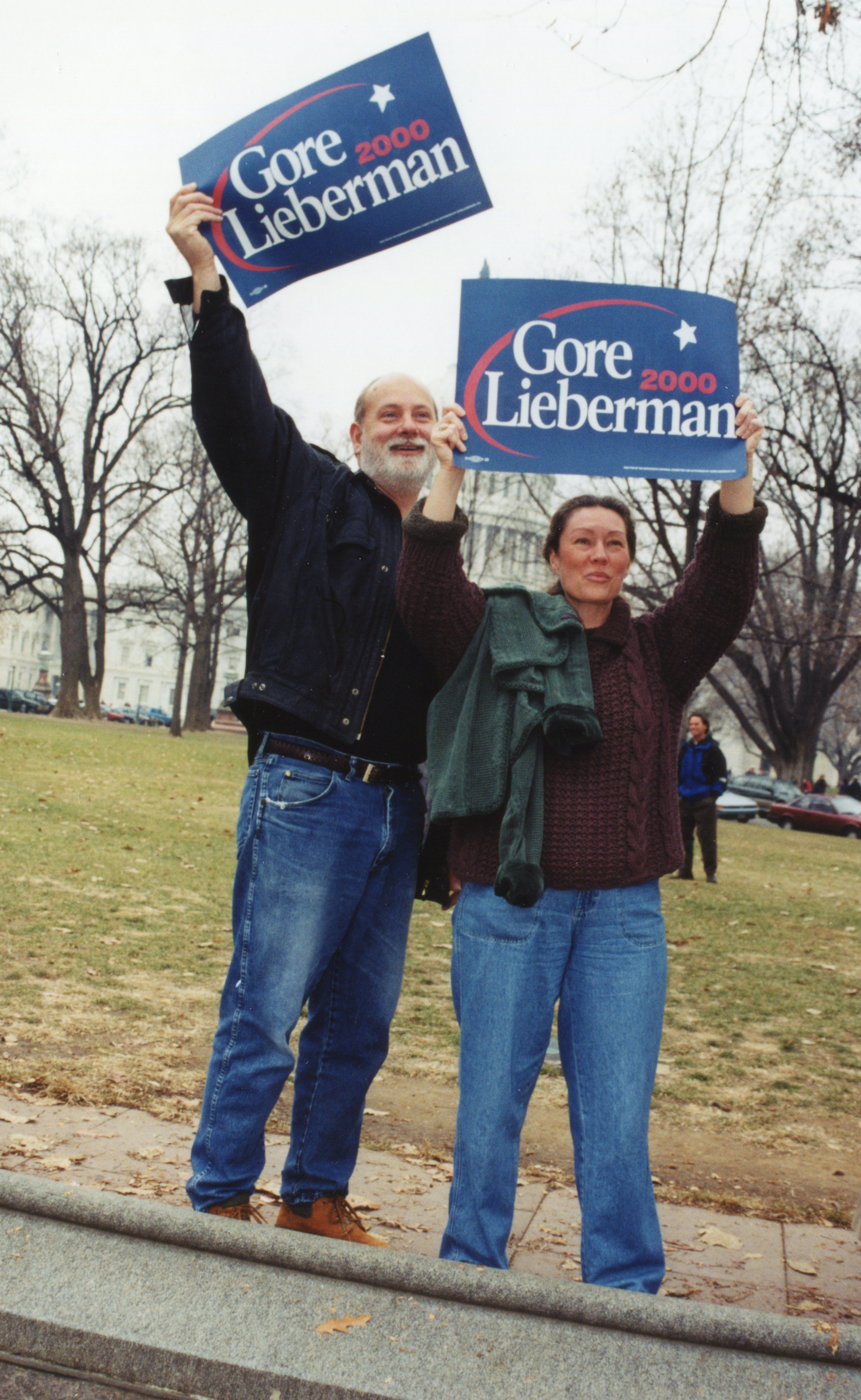
Gore-Lieberman supporters outside the U.S. Supreme Court

On December 12, the Supreme Court in Bush v. Gore issued a 5–4 per curiam decision that the Florida Supreme Court's ruling requiring a statewide recount of ballots was unconstitutional on equal protection grounds, and in a 5–4 vote reversed and remanded the case to the Florida Supreme Court for modification before the optional "safe harbor" deadline, which the Supreme Court decided the Florida court had said the state intended to meet. With only two hours remaining until the December 12 deadline, the Supreme Court's order effectively ended the recount, and the previously certified total held.

==== Legislative action ====
Even if the Supreme Court had decided differently in Bush v. Gore, the Florida Legislature had been meeting in Special Session since December 8 with the purpose of selecting of a slate of electors on December 12 should the dispute still be ongoing. Had the recount gone forward, it would have awarded those electors to Bush, based on the state-certified vote, and Gore's likely last recourse would have been to contest the electors in the United States Congress. The electors would then have been rejected only if both houses agreed to do so.

==== Media recounts ====
From the beginning of the controversy, politicians, litigants, and the press focused exclusively on undervotes, in particular incompletely punched hanging chads. Undervotes were the subject of much media coverage, most of the lawsuits, and the Florida Supreme Court ruling. After the election, recounts by various U.S. news media organizations continued to focus on undervotes. Results of reviews of these ballots indicated that Bush would have won if certain recounting methods had been used (including the one Gore favored at the time of the Supreme Court decision), but that Gore might have won under other standards and scenarios.

Later, a larger consortium of news organizations, including USA Today, The Miami Herald, Knight Ridder, The Tampa Tribune, and five other newspapers conducted a full recount of all machine-rejected ballots, including both undervotes and overvotes. It found that Bush won under stricter standards and Gore won under looser standards.

Finally, the National Opinion Research Center at the University of Chicago, sponsored by a consortium of major U.S. news organizations, conducted the Florida Ballot Project, a comprehensive review of ballots collected from the entire state, not just the disputed counties that were recounted. Based on the NORC review, the media group concluded that if the disputes over the validity of all the ballots in question had been consistently resolved and any uniform standard applied, Gore would have won Florida by 60 to 171 votes. The standards chosen for the NORC study ranged from a "most restrictive" standard to a "most inclusive" standard. An analysis of the NORC data by University of Pennsylvania researcher Steven F. Freeman and journalist Joel Bleifuss concluded that, no matter the standard used, after a recount of all uncounted votes, Gore would have been the victor.

According to factcheck.org, "Nobody can say for sure who might have won. A full, official recount of all votes statewide could have gone either way, but one was never conducted." CNN and PBS reported that, had the recount continued with its existing standards, Bush would likely have still tallied more votes, but variations of those standards (or of which precincts were recounted) could have swung the election either way. They also concluded that had a full recount of all undervotes and overvotes taken place, Gore would have won, though his legal team never pursued such an option. The post-controversy recounts revealed that "if a manual recount had been limited to undervotes, it would have produced an inaccurate picture of the electorate's position."

=== National results ===
Though Gore came in second in the electoral vote, he received 543,895 more popular votes than Bush, making him the first person since Grover Cleveland in 1888 to win the popular vote but lose in the Electoral College. Gore failed to win the popular vote in his home state, Tennessee, which both he and his father had represented in the Senate, making him the first major-party presidential candidate to have lost his home state since George McGovern lost South Dakota in 1972. Gore also lost West Virginia, a state that had last voted Republican in 1984, but has since always voted Republican.

This was the first time since 1948 that Democrats won the popular vote in three consecutive elections. This is one of only four U.S. presidential elections in which the winner did not carry any of the three Rust Belt states of Michigan, Pennsylvania, and Wisconsin; the others were 2004, 1916 and 1884. The 2000 election was also a rare instance in which the party controlling the White House lost a presidential election when the U.S. economy was not in a recession, the 1968 election being the most recent one. It is also the only election since 1968 where the popular vote was decided by under 1%.

Before the election, the possibility that different candidates would win the popular vote and the Electoral College had been noted, but usually with the expectation of Gore winning the Electoral College and Bush the popular vote. The idea that Bush could win the Electoral College and Gore the popular vote was not considered likely.

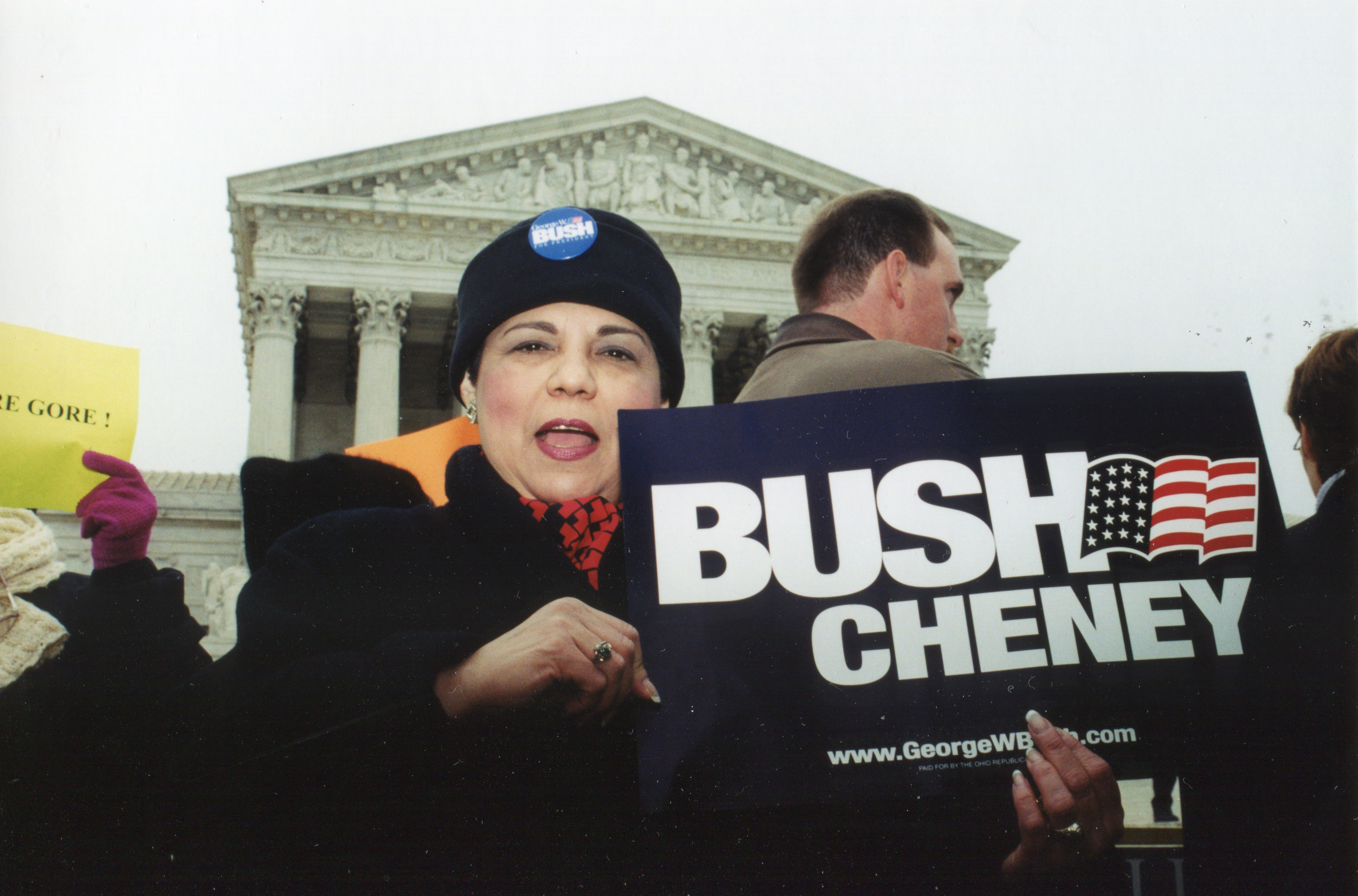
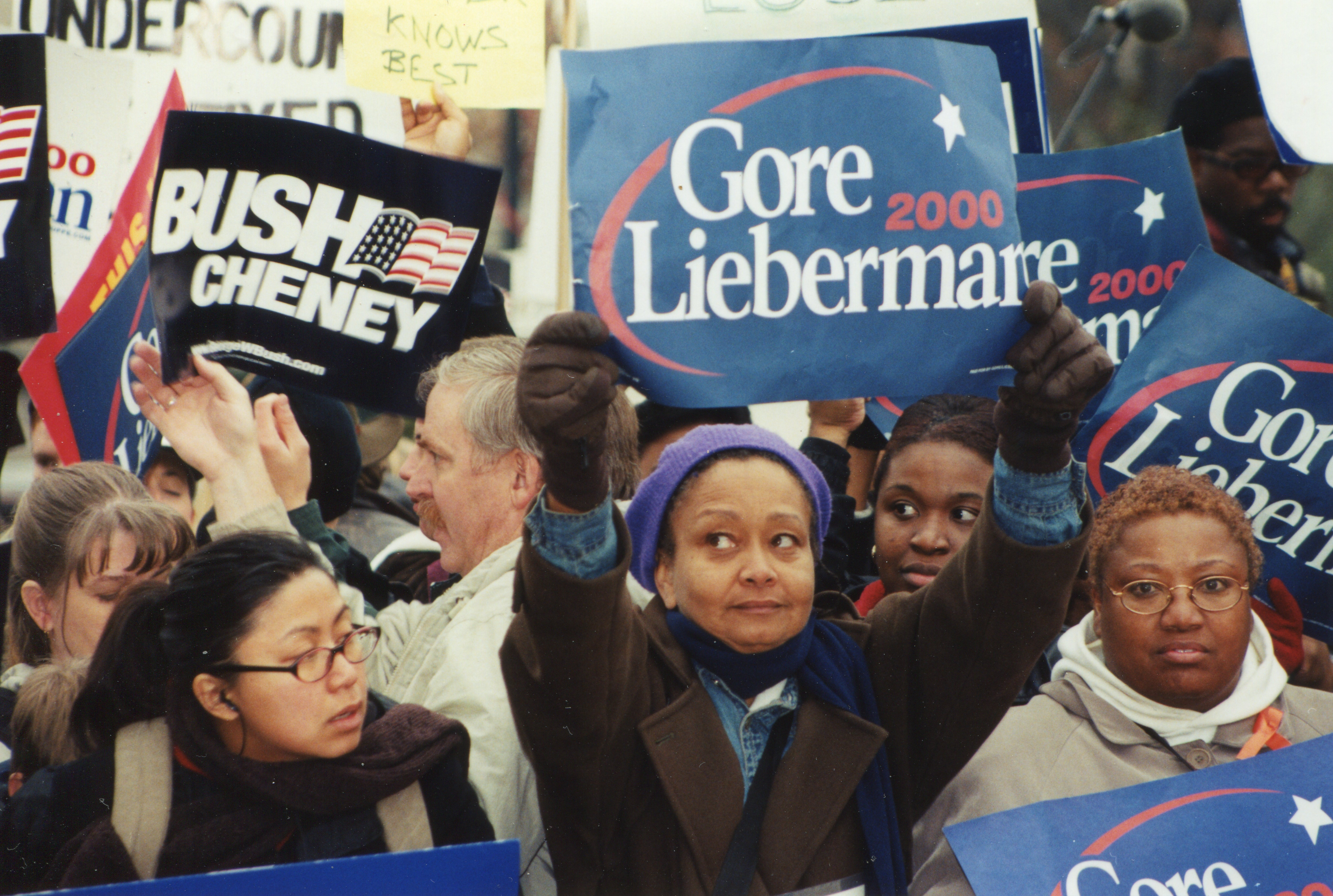
Bush–Cheney and Gore–Lieberman supporters protest

This was the first time since 1928 when a non-incumbent Republican candidate won West Virginia. The Electoral College results were the closest since 1876, making this election the second-closest Electoral College result in history and the third-closest popular vote victory. Gore's 266 electoral votes are the highest for a losing nominee. The 537-vote margin in Florida is the closest for a tipping point state in history. Bush was the first winning Republican since William McKinley to win with under 300 electoral votes. He was also the first son of a former president to be elected president himself since John Quincy Adams in 1824.

Bush was the first Republican in American history to win the presidency without carrying Vermont, Illinois, or New Mexico, as well as the second Republican to win the presidency without carrying California after James A. Garfield in 1880, and Pennsylvania, Maine, Michigan, and Connecticut after Richard Nixon in 1968, as well as the first winning Republican not to receive any electoral votes from California as Garfield received one electoral vote in 1880. Bush was the first Republican to win without New Jersey or Delaware since 1888. As of 2024, Bush is the last Republican nominee to win New Hampshire.

This marked the first time since Iowa entered the union in 1846 in which the state voted for a Democratic presidential candidate in four elections in a row, and was the last time until 2020 that Iowa did not vote for the winning candidate. Bush is the second Republican to win the presidency without Iowa (his father was the first, in 1988). This election was the first time since 1976 that New Jersey, Connecticut, Vermont, Maine, Illinois, New Mexico, Michigan, and California voted for the losing candidate, as well as the first since 1980 that Maryland did so, the first since 1948 that Delaware did so, and the first since 1968 that Pennsylvania did so.

There were only two counties in the nation that had voted Republican in 1996 and flipped to the Democratic column in 2000: Charles County, Maryland, and Orange County, Florida, both rapidly diversifying counties, neither of which has voted Republican since. Until 2024, this was the last time in which an incumbent vice president ran for president.

This was the last time a Republican received any electoral votes from the Northeast until 2016. This and the following election were the only ones since 1980 in which the winner received fewer than 300 electoral votes (less than 55% of the total). Bush is the most recent candidate with gubernatorial experience to win the presidency. This is the most recent election in which both major-party nominees were under age 60, and in which the popular vote margin was under 1% and 1 million votes.

Electoral results
Presidential candidate	Party	Home state	Popular vote		Electoral vote	Running mate		
Presidential candidate	Party	Home state	Count	Percentage	Electoral vote	Vice-presidential candidate	Home state	Electoral vote
George W. Bush	Republican	Texas	50,456,002	47.87%	271	Dick Cheney	Wyoming	271
Al Gore	Democratic	Tennessee	50,999,897	48.38%	266	Joe Lieberman	Connecticut	266
Ralph Nader	Green	Connecticut	2,882,955	2.74%	0	Winona LaDuke	Minnesota	0
Pat Buchanan	Reform	Virginia	448,895	0.43%	0	Ezola Foster	California	0
Harry Browne	Libertarian	Tennessee	384,431	0.36%	0	Art Olivier	California	0
Howard Phillips	Constitution	Virginia	98,020	0.09%	0	Curtis Frazier	Missouri	0
John Hagelin	Natural Law	Iowa	83,714	0.08%	0	Nat Goldhaber	California	0
Other			51,186	0.05%	—	Other		—
(Undervote) (Note: One faithless elector from Washington, D.C., Barbara Lett-Simmons, cast a blank ballot in protest of the District's lack of voting representation in the United States Congress. Washington, D.C. has a non-voting delegate to Congress. She had been expected to vote for Gore/Lieberman.)	—	—	[data missing]	—	1	(Undervote)	—	1
Total			105,405,100	100%	538			538
Needed to win					270			270

Source: "2000 Presidential Electoral and Popular Vote" (Excel 4.0). Federal Election Commission.

Popular vote
Gore	48.38%
Bush	47.87%
Nader	2.74%
Buchanan	0.43%
Browne	0.36%
Others	0.22%

Electoral vote
Bush	50.37%
Gore	49.44%
Abstention	0.19%

=== Results by state ===
Legend
States/districts won by Gore/Lieberman
States/districts won by Bush/Cheney
†	At-large results (For states that split electoral votes)

		George W. Bush Republican			Al Gore Democratic			Ralph Nader Green			Pat Buchanan Reform			Harry Browne Libertarian			Howard Phillips Constitution			John Hagelin Natural Law			Others			Margin		Margin swing (Note: Percentage point difference in margin from the 1996 election)	State total	
State	EV	#	%	EV	#	%	EV	#	%	EV	#	%	EV	#	%	EV	#	%	EV	#	%	EV	#	%	EV	#	%	%	#	
Alabama	9	941,173	56.48%	9	692,611	41.57%	–	18,323	1.10%	–	6,351	0.38%	–	5,893	0.35%	–	775	0.05%	–	447	0.03%	–	699	0.04%	–	248,562	14.92%	7.96%	1,666,272	AL
Alaska	3	167,398	58.62%	3	79,004	27.67%	–	28,747	10.07%	–	5,192	1.82%	–	2,636	0.92%	–	596	0.21%	–	919	0.32%	–	1,068	0.37%	–	88,394	30.95%	13.42%	285,560	AK
Arizona*	8	781,652	51.02%	8	685,341	44.73%	–	45,645	2.98%	–	12,373	0.81%	–	–	–	–	110	0.01%	–	1,120	0.07%	–	5,775	0.38%	–	96,311	6.29%	8.52%	1,532,016	AZ
Arkansas	6	472,940	51.31%	6	422,768	45.86%	–	13,421	1.46%	–	7,358	0.80%	–	2,781	0.30%	–	1,415	0.15%	–	1,098	0.12%	–	–	–	–	50,172	5.44%	22.38%	921,781	AR
California	54	4,567,429	41.65%	–	5,861,203	53.45%	54	418,707	3.82%	–	44,987	0.41%	–	45,520	0.42%	–	17,042	0.16%	–	10,934	0.10%	–	34	0.00%	–	−1,293,774	−11.80%	1.09%	10,965,856	CA
Colorado	8	883,748	50.75%	8	738,227	42.39%	–	91,434	5.25%	–	10,465	0.60%	–	12,799	0.73%	–	1,319	0.08%	–	2,240	0.13%	–	1,136	0.07%	–	145,521	8.36%	6.99%	1,741,368	CO
Connecticut	8	561,094	38.44%	–	816,015	55.91%	8	64,452	4.42%	–	4,731	0.32%	–	3,484	0.24%	–	9,695	0.66%	–	40	0.00%	–	14	0.00%	–	−254,921	−17.47%	0.67%	1,459,525	CT
Delaware	3	137,288	41.90%	–	180,068	54.96%	3	8,307	2.54%	–	777	0.24%	–	774	0.24%	–	208	0.06%	–	107	0.03%	–	93	0.03%	–	−42,780	−13.06%	2.16%	327,622	DE
D.C.	3	18,073	8.95%	–	171,923	85.16%	2	10,576	5.24%	–	–	–	–	669	0.33%	–	–	–	–	–	–	–	653	0.32%	1	−153,850	−76.20%	−0.35%	201,894	DC
Florida	25	2,912,790	48.85%	25	2,912,253	48.84%	–	97,488	1.63%	–	17,484	0.29%	–	16,415	0.28%	–	1,371	0.02%	–	2,281	0.04%	–	3,028	0.05%	–	537	0.01%	5.71%	5,963,110	FL
Georgia	13	1,419,720	54.67%	13	1,116,230	42.98%	–	13,432	0.52%	–	10,926	0.42%	–	36,332	1.40%	–	140	0.01%	–	–	–	–	24	0.00%	–	303,490	11.69%	10.52%	2,596,804	GA
Hawaii	4	137,845	37.46%	–	205,286	55.79%	4	21,623	5.88%	–	1,071	0.29%	–	1,477	0.40%	–	343	0.09%	–	306	0.08%	–	–	–	–	−67,441	−18.33%	6.96%	367,951	HI
Idaho	4	336,937	67.17%	4	138,637	27.64%	–	12,292	2.45%	–	7,615	1.52%	–	3,488	0.70%	–	1,469	0.29%	–	1,177	0.23%	–	6	0.00%	–	198,300	39.53%	21.00%	501,621	ID
Illinois	22	2,019,421	42.58%	–	2,589,026	54.60%	22	103,759	2.19%	–	16,106	0.34%	–	11,623	0.25%	–	57	0.00%	–	2,127	0.04%	–	4	0.00%	–	−569,605	−12.01%	5.50%	4,742,123	IL
Indiana	12	1,245,836	56.65%	12	901,980	41.01%	–	18,531	0.84%	–	16,959	0.77%	–	15,530	0.71%	–	200	0.01%	–	167	0.01%	–	99	0.00%	–	343,856	15.63%	10.05%	2,199,302	IN
Iowa	7	634,373	48.22%	–	638,517	48.54%	7	29,374	2.23%	–	5,731	0.44%	–	3,209	0.24%	–	613	0.05%	–	2,281	0.17%	–	1,465	0.11%	–	−4,144	−0.31%	10.03%	1,315,563	IA
Kansas	6	622,332	58.04%	6	399,276	37.24%	–	36,086	3.37%	–	7,370	0.69%	–	4,525	0.42%	–	1,254	0.12%	–	1,375	0.13%	–	–	–	–	223,056	20.80%	2.59%	1,072,218	KS
Kentucky	8	872,492	56.50%	8	638,898	41.37%	–	23,192	1.50%	–	4,173	0.27%	–	2,896	0.19%	–	923	0.06%	–	1,533	0.10%	–	80	0.01%	–	233,594	15.13%	16.09%	1,544,187	KY
Louisiana	9	927,871	52.55%	9	792,344	44.88%	–	20,473	1.16%	–	14,356	0.81%	–	2,951	0.17%	–	5,483	0.31%	–	1,075	0.06%	–	1,103	0.06%	–	135,527	7.68%	19.75%	1,765,656	LA
Maine^{†}	2	286,616	43.97%	–	319,951	49.09%	2	37,127	5.70%	–	4,443	0.68%	–	3,074	0.47%	–	579	0.09%	–	–	–	–	27	0.00%	–	−33,335	−5.11%	15.75%	651,817	ME
ME-1	1	148,618	42.59%	–	176,293	50.52%	1	20,297	5.82%	–	1,994	0.57%	–	1,479	0.42%	–	253	0.07%	–	–	–	–	17	0.00%	–	−27,675	−7.93%	12.37%	348,951	ME-1
ME-2	1	137,998	45.56%	–	143,658	47.43%	1	16,830	5.56%	–	2,449	0.81%	–	1,595	0.53%	–	326	0.11%	–	–	–	–	10	0.00%	–	−5,660	−1.87%	19.63%	302,866	ME-2
Maryland	10	813,797	40.18%	–	1,145,782	56.57%	10	53,768	2.65%	–	4,248	0.21%	–	5,310	0.26%	–	919	0.05%	–	176	0.01%	–	1,480	0.07%	–	−331,985	−16.39%	−0.41%	2,025,480	MD
Massachusetts	12	878,502	32.50%	–	1,616,487	59.80%	12	173,564	6.42%	–	11,149	0.41%	–	16,366	0.61%	–	–	–	–	2,884	0.11%	–	4,032	0.15%	–	−737,985	−27.30%	6.09%	2,702,984	MA
Michigan	18	1,953,139	46.15%	–	2,170,418	51.28%	18	84,165	1.99%	–	1,851	0.04%	–	16,711	0.39%	–	3,791	0.09%	–	2,426	0.06%	–	–	–	–	−217,279	−5.13%	8.08%	4,232,501	MI
Minnesota	10	1,109,659	45.50%	–	1,168,266	47.91%	10	126,696	5.20%	–	22,166	0.91%	–	5,282	0.22%	–	3,272	0.13%	–	2,294	0.09%	–	1,050	0.04%	–	−58,607	−2.40%	13.74%	2,438,685	MN
Mississippi	7	572,844	57.62%	7	404,614	40.70%	–	8,122	0.82%	–	2,265	0.23%	–	2,009	0.20%	–	3,267	0.33%	–	450	0.05%	–	613	0.06%	–	168,230	16.92%	11.79%	994,184	MS
Missouri	11	1,189,924	50.42%	11	1,111,138	47.08%	–	38,515	1.63%	–	9,818	0.42%	–	7,436	0.32%	–	1,957	0.08%	–	1,104	0.05%	–	–	–	–	78,786	3.34%	9.64%	2,359,892	MO
Montana	3	240,178	58.44%	3	137,126	33.36%	–	24,437	5.95%	–	5,697	1.39%	–	1,718	0.42%	–	1,155	0.28%	–	675	0.16%	–	11	0.00%	–	103,052	25.07%	22.19%	410,997	MT
Nebraska^{†}	2	433,862	62.25%	2	231,780	33.25%	–	24,540	3.52%	–	3,646	0.52%	–	2,245	0.32%	–	468	0.07%	–	478	0.07%	–	–	–	–	202,082	28.99%	10.29%	697,019	NE
NE-1	1	142,562	58.90%	1	86,946	35.92%	–	10,085	4.17%	–	1,324	0.55%	–	754	0.31%	–	167	0.07%	–	185	0.08%	–	–	–	–	55,616	22.98%	11.28%	242,023	NE-1
NE-2	1	131,485	56.92%	1	88,975	38.52%	–	8,495	3.68%	–	845	0.37%	–	925	0.40%	–	146	0.06%	–	141	0.06%	–	–	–	–	42,510	18.40%	3.90%	231,012	NE-2
NE-3	1	159,815	71.35%	1	55,859	24.94%	–	5,960	2.66%	–	1,477	0.66%	–	566	0.25%	–	155	0.07%	–	152	0.07%	–	–	–	–	103,956	46.41%	16.31%	223,984	NE-3
Nevada	4	301,575	49.52%	4	279,978	45.98%	–	15,008	2.46%	–	4,747	0.78%	–	3,311	0.54%	–	621	0.10%	–	415	0.07%	–	3,315	0.54%	–	21,597	3.55%	4.57%	608,970	NV
New Hampshire	4	273,559	48.07%	4	266,348	46.80%	–	22,198	3.90%	–	2,615	0.46%	–	2,757	0.48%	–	328	0.06%	–	55	0.01%	–	1,221	0.21%	–	7,211	1.27%	11.22%	569,081	NH
New Jersey	15	1,284,173	40.29%	–	1,788,850	56.13%	15	94,554	2.97%	–	6,989	0.22%	–	6,312	0.20%	–	1,409	0.04%	–	2,215	0.07%	–	2,724	0.09%	–	−504,677	−15.83%	2.03%	3,187,226	NJ
New Mexico	5	286,417	47.85%	–	286,783	47.91%	5	21,251	3.55%	–	1,392	0.23%	–	2,058	0.34%	–	343	0.06%	–	361	0.06%	–	–	–	–	−366	−0.06%	7.26%	598,605	NM
New York	33	2,403,374	35.23%	–	4,107,697	60.21%	33	244,030	3.58%	–	31,599	0.46%	–	7,649	0.11%	–	1,498	0.02%	–	24,361	0.36%	–	1,791	0.03%	–	−1,704,323	−24.98%	3.88%	6,821,999	NY
North Carolina	14	1,631,163	56.03%	14	1,257,692	43.20%	–	–	–	–	8,874	0.30%	–	12,307	0.42%	–	–	–	–	–	–	–	1,226	0.04%	–	373,471	12.83%	8.14%	2,911,262	NC
North Dakota	3	174,852	60.66%	3	95,284	33.06%	–	9,486	3.29%	–	7,288	2.53%	–	660	0.23%	–	373	0.13%	–	313	0.11%	–	–	–	–	79,568	27.60%	20.79%	288,256	ND
Ohio	21	2,351,209	49.97%	21	2,186,190	46.46%	–	117,857	2.50%	–	26,724	0.57%	–	13,475	0.29%	–	3,823	0.08%	–	6,169	0.13%	–	10	0.00%	–	165,019	3.51%	9.87%	4,705,457	OH
Oklahoma	8	744,337	60.31%	8	474,276	38.43%	–	–	–	–	9,014	0.73%	–	6,602	0.53%	–	–	–	–	–	–	–	–	–	–	270,061	21.88%	14.07%	1,234,229	OK
Oregon	7	713,577	46.52%	–	720,342	46.96%	7	77,357	5.04%	–	7,063	0.46%	–	7,447	0.49%	–	2,189	0.14%	–	2,574	0.17%	–	3,419	0.22%	–	−6,765	−0.44%	7.65%	1,533,968	OR
Pennsylvania	23	2,281,127	46.43%	–	2,485,967	50.60%	23	103,392	2.10%	–	16,023	0.33%	–	11,248	0.23%	–	14,428	0.29%	–	–	–	–	934	0.02%	–	−204,840	−4.17%	5.03%	4,913,119	PA
Rhode Island	4	130,555	31.91%	–	249,508	60.99%	4	25,052	6.12%	–	2,273	0.56%	–	742	0.18%	–	97	0.02%	–	271	0.07%	–	614	0.15%	–	−118,953	−29.08%	3.81%	409,112	RI
South Carolina	8	785,937	56.84%	8	565,561	40.90%	–	20,200	1.46%	–	3,519	0.25%	–	4,876	0.35%	–	1,682	0.12%	–	942	0.07%	–	–	–	–	220,376	15.94%	10.11%	1,382,717	SC
South Dakota	3	190,700	60.30%	3	118,804	37.56%	–	–	–	–	3,322	1.05%	–	1,662	0.53%	–	1,781	0.56%	–	–	–	–	–	–	–	71,896	22.73%	19.27%	316,269	SD
Tennessee	11	1,061,949	51.15%	11	981,720	47.28%	–	19,781	0.95%	–	4,250	0.20%	–	4,284	0.21%	–	1,015	0.05%	–	613	0.03%	–	2,569	0.12%	–	80,229	3.86%	6.27%	2,076,181	TN
Texas	32	3,799,639	59.30%	32	2,433,746	37.98%	–	137,994	2.15%	–	12,394	0.19%	–	23,160	0.36%	–	567	0.01%	–	–	–	–	137	0.00%	–	1,365,893	21.32%	16.39%	6,407,637	TX
Utah	5	515,096	66.83%	5	203,053	26.34%	–	35,850	4.65%	–	9,319	1.21%	–	3,616	0.47%	–	2,709	0.35%	–	763	0.10%	–	348	0.05%	–	312,043	40.49%	19.42%	770,754	UT
Vermont	3	119,775	40.70%	–	149,022	50.63%	3	20,374	6.92%	–	2,192	0.74%	–	784	0.27%	–	153	0.05%	–	219	0.07%	–	1,789	0.61%	–	−29,247	−9.94%	12.32%	294,308	VT
Virginia	13	1,437,490	52.47%	13	1,217,290	44.44%	–	59,398	2.17%	–	5,455	0.20%	–	15,198	0.55%	–	1,809	0.07%	–	171	0.01%	–	2,636	0.10%	–	220,200	8.04%	6.09%	2,739,447	VA
Washington	11	1,108,864	44.58%	–	1,247,652	50.16%	11	103,002	4.14%	–	7,171	0.29%	–	13,135	0.53%	–	1,989	0.08%	–	2,927	0.12%	–	2,693	0.11%	–	−138,788	−5.58%	6.96%	2,487,433	WA
West Virginia	5	336,475	51.92%	5	295,497	45.59%	–	10,680	1.65%	–	3,169	0.49%	–	1,912	0.30%	–	23	0.00%	–	367	0.06%	–	1	0.00%	–	40,978	6.32%	21.07%	648,124	WV
Wisconsin	11	1,237,279	47.61%	–	1,242,987	47.83%	11	94,070	3.62%	–	11,471	0.44%	–	6,640	0.26%	–	2,042	0.08%	–	853	0.03%	–	3,265	0.13%	–	−5,708	−0.22%	10.11%	2,598,607	WI
Wyoming	3	147,947	67.76%	3	60,481	27.70%	–	4,625	2.12%	–	2,724	1.25%	–	1,443	0.66%	–	720	0.33%	–	411	0.19%	–	–	–	–	87,466	40.06%	27.09%	218,351	WY
Totals^{†}	538	50,456,002	47.86%	271	50,999,897	48.38%	266	2,882,955	2.74%	–	448,895	0.43%	–	384,431*	0.36%*	–	98,020	0.09%	–	83,714	0.08%	–	51,186	0.05%	–	−543,895	−0.52%	8.00%	105,405,100	US

^{†}Maine and Nebraska each allow for their electoral votes to be split between candidates. In both states, two electoral votes are awarded to the winner of the statewide race and one electoral vote is awarded to the winner of each congressional district. The votes for each candidate are only singly counted in the column totals.

*The Libertarian Party of Arizona had ballot access but opted to supplant Browne with L. Neil Smith. In Arizona, Smith received 5,775 votes, or 0.38% of the Arizona vote. Adding Smith's 5,775 votes to Browne's 384,431 votes nationwide, the total votes cast for president for the Libertarian Party in 2000 was 390,206, or 0.37% of the national vote.

==== States that flipped from Democratic to Republican ====
- Arizona
- Arkansas
- Florida
- Kentucky
- Louisiana
- Missouri
- Nevada
- New Hampshire
- Ohio
- Tennessee
- West Virginia

==== Close states ====
Al Gore
George W. Bush

States where the margin of victory was less than 1% (55 electoral votes):

1. Florida, 0.009% (537 votes) (tipping point state)
2. New Mexico, 0.061% (366 votes)
3. Wisconsin, 0.22% (5,708 votes)
4. Iowa, 0.31% (4,144 votes)
5. Oregon, 0.44% (6,765 votes)

States where the margin of victory was more than 1% but less than 5% (85 electoral votes):

1. New Hampshire, 1.27% (7,211 votes)
2. Maine's 2nd Congressional District, 1.87% (5,660 votes)
3. Minnesota, 2.41% (58,607 votes)
4. Missouri, 3.34% (78,786 votes)
5. Ohio, 3.51% (165,019 votes)
6. Nevada, 3.54% (21,597 votes)
7. Tennessee, 3.87% (80,229 votes)
8. Pennsylvania, 4.17% (204,840 votes)

States where the margin of victory was more than 5% but less than 10% (84 electoral votes):

1. Maine, 5.12% (33,335 votes)
2. Michigan, 5.14% (217,279 votes)
3. Arkansas, 5.45% (50,172 votes)
4. Washington, 5.57% (138,788 votes)
5. Arizona, 6.28% (96,311 votes)
6. West Virginia, 6.33% (40,978 votes)
7. Louisiana, 7.67% (135,527 votes)
8. Maine's 1st Congressional District, 7.93% (27,675 votes)
9. Virginia, 8.03% (220,200 votes)
10. Colorado, 8.36% (145,518 votes)
11. Vermont, 9.93% (29,247 votes)

==== Statistics ====
Counties with highest percent of vote (Republican)

1. Glasscock County, Texas 92.47%
2. Ochiltree County, Texas 90.72%
3. Hansford County, Texas 89.75%
4. Harding County, South Dakota 88.92%
5. Carter County, Montana 88.84%

Counties with highest percent of vote (Democratic)

1. Macon County, Alabama 86.80%
2. Bronx County, New York 86.28%
3. Shannon County, South Dakota 85.36%
4. Washington, D.C. 85.16%
5. City of Baltimore, Maryland 82.52%

Counties with highest percent of vote (other)

1. San Miguel County, Colorado 17.20%
2. Missoula County, Montana 15.03%
3. Grand County, Utah 14.94%
4. Mendocino County, California 14.68%
5. Hampshire County, Massachusetts 14.59%

=== Maps ===
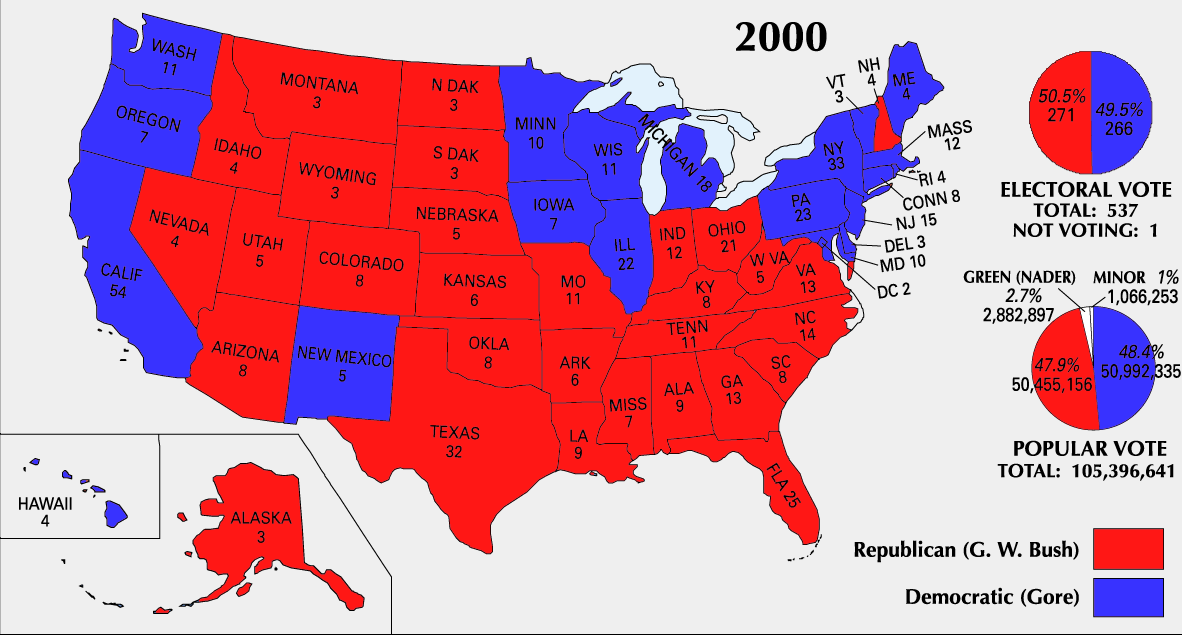
Results by state with pie charts for the electoral college and popular vote

Results by county, (Note: Alaska and Louisiana do not have counties. Alaska's boroughs and census areas and Louisiana's parishes are pictured.) shaded according to winning candidate's percentage of the vote

Results by congressional district, shaded according to winning candidate's percentage of the vote

Vote share by county for Green Party candidate Ralph Nader. Darker shades indicate a stronger Green performance.

Percentage of votes received by Pat Buchanan/Reform Party in the 2000 US presidential election by state or territory

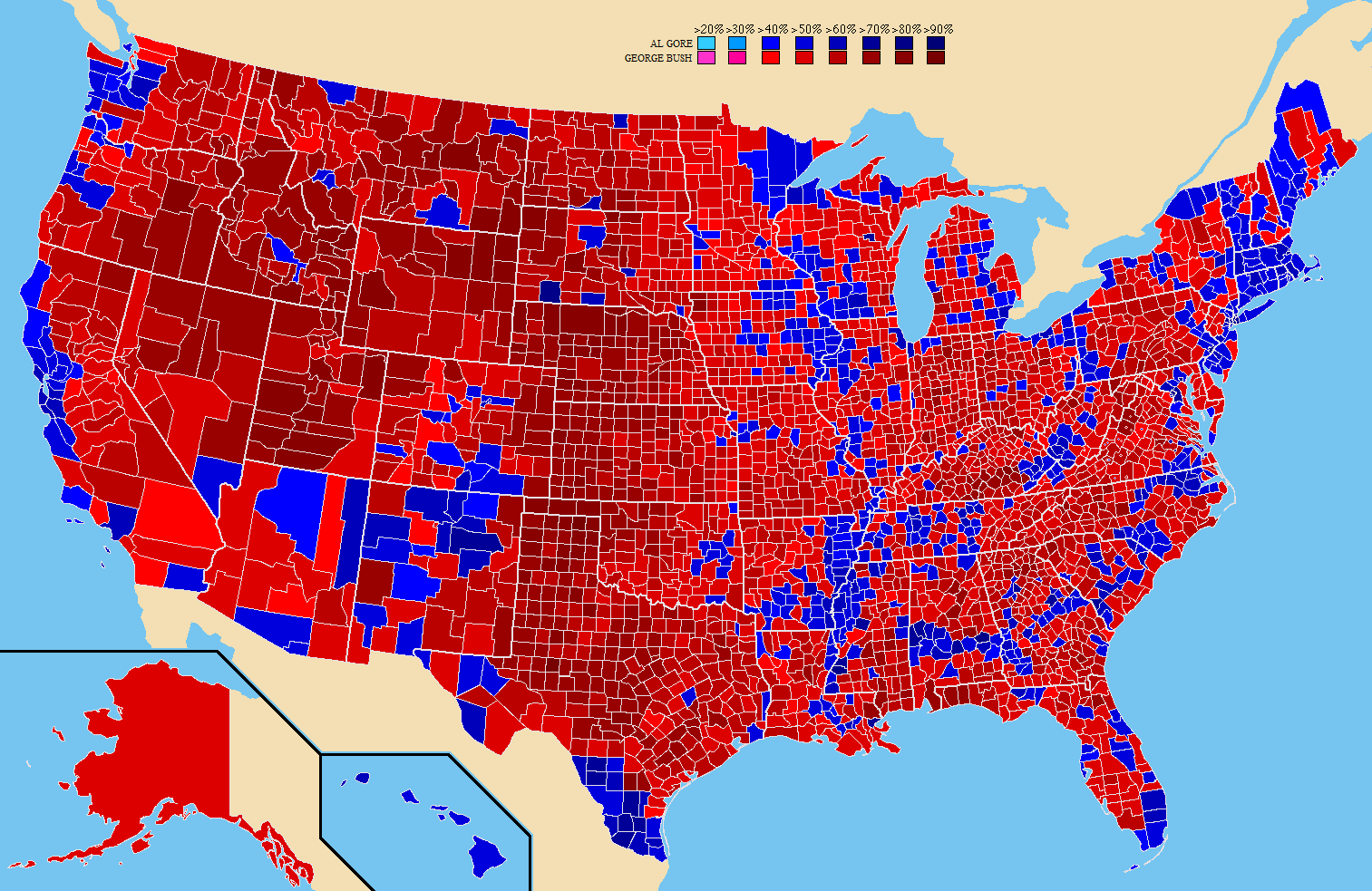
Election results by county

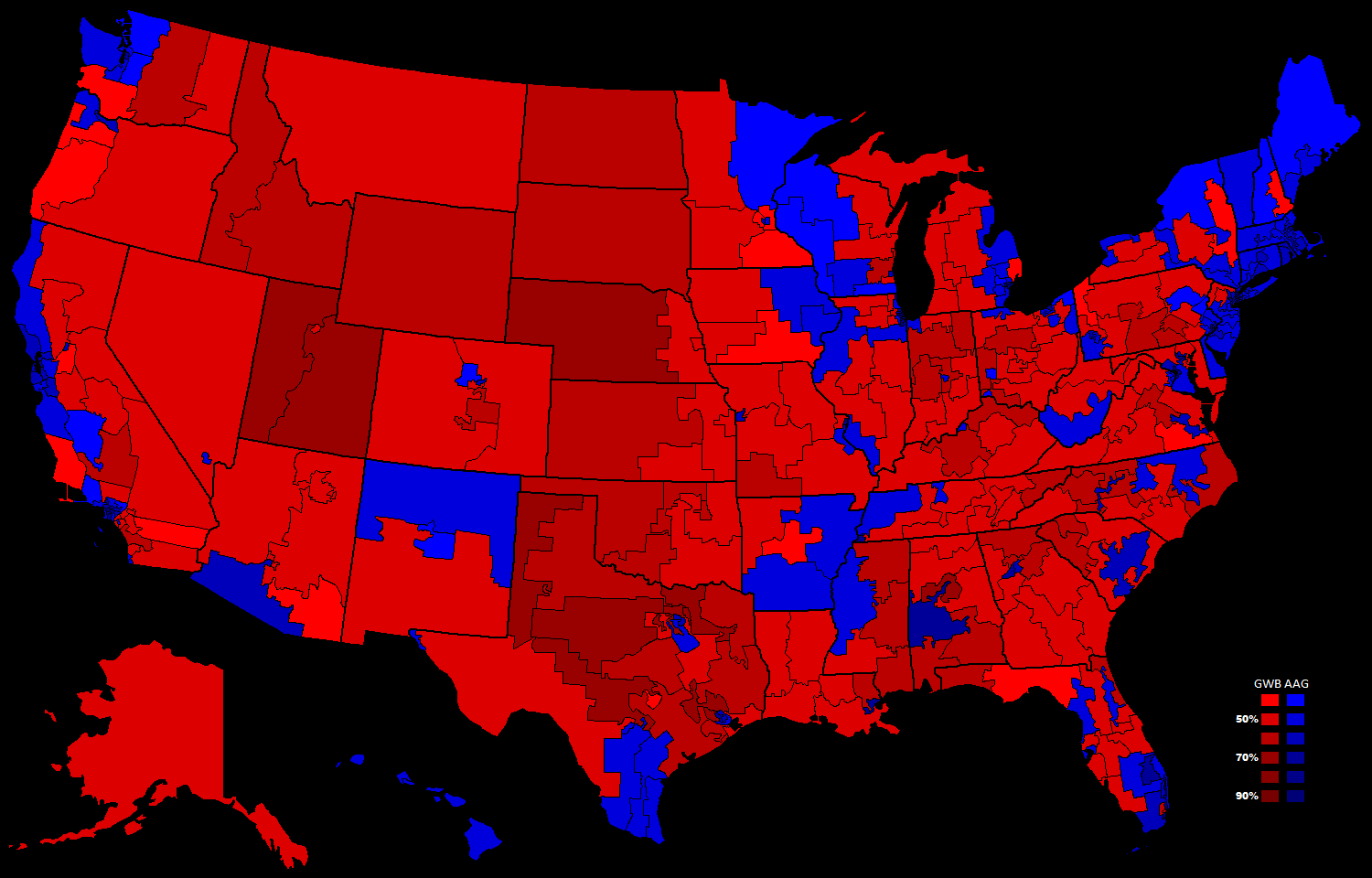
Election results by congressional district

Results by county flips from 1996 to the 2000 presidential election

Change in vote margins at the county level from the 1996 election to the 2000 election

== Voter demographics ==
The 2000 presidential vote by demographic subgroup
Demographic subgroup	Gore	Bush	Other	% of total vote
Total vote	48	48	4	100
Ideology
Liberals	81	13	6	20
Moderates	53	45	2	50
Conservatives	17	82	1	29
Party
Democrats	87	11	2	39
Republicans	8	91	1	35
Independents	46	48	6	26
Gender
Men	43	54	3	48
Women	54	44	2	52
Race
White	42	55	3	81
Black	90	9	1	10
Asian	55	41	4	2
Hispanic	62	35	3	7
Age
18–24 years old	47	47	6	9
25–29 years old	49	46	5	8
30–49 years old	48	50	2	45
50–64 years old	50	48	2	24
65 and older	51	47	2	14
Sexual orientation
Gay, lesbian, or bisexual	71	25	4	4
Heterosexual	47	50	3	96
Family income
Under $15,000	58	38	4	7
$15,000–30,000	54	42	4	16
$30,000–50,000	49	48	3	24
$50,000–75,000	46	51	3	25
$75,000–100,000	46	52	2	13
Over $100,000	43	55	2	15
Region
East	56	40	4	23
Midwest	48	49	3	26
South	43	56	1	31
West	49	47	4	20
Union households
Union	59	37	4	26
Non-union	45	53	2	74

Source: Voter News Service exit poll from the Roper Center for Public Opinion Research (13,225 surveyed)

== Aftermath ==
After Florida was decided and Gore conceded, Texas Governor George W. Bush became the president-elect and began forming his transition committee. In a speech on December 13, in the Texas House of Representatives chamber, Bush said he was reaching across party lines to bridge a divided America, saying, "the President of the United States is the President of every single American, of every race, and every background". During the transition period, Clinton staffers, upset by Gore's loss, reportedly vandalized White House furnishings, including removing the W keys from computer keyboards and stealing items, including several antique doorknobs. Approximately $15,000 in damage was reported. This election was one of only four U.S. presidential elections held since the Democrats and Republicans became the two major parties in which the winner did not carry any of the three Rust Belt states of Michigan, Pennsylvania, and Wisconsin; the others were 1884, 1916, and 2004, when Bush was reelected.

=== Post-recount ===
Joint session of Congress certifying the election results alongside Al Gore; January 6, 2001

On January 6, 2001, a joint session of Congress met to count the electoral votes. Twenty members of the House of Representatives, most of them members of the all-Democratic Congressional Black Caucus, rose one by one to file objections to the electoral votes of Florida. But pursuant to the Electoral Count Act, any such objection had to be sponsored by both a representative and a senator. No senator co-sponsored these objections, deferring to the Supreme Court's ruling. Therefore, Gore, who presided in his capacity as President of the Senate, ruled each of these objections out of order. Subsequently, Congress counted the electoral votes from all 50 states and the District of Columbia. Gore was the last incumbent vice president until Kamala Harris to certify their opponent's Electoral College victory in a presidential election.

Bush took the oath of office on January 20, 2001. He served for the next eight years. Gore has not, as of 2024, considered another presidential run, endorsing Howard Dean's candidacy during the 2004 Democratic primary and remaining neutral in the Democratic primaries of 2008, 2016 and 2020.

The first independent recount of undervotes was conducted by the Miami Herald and USA Today. The commission found that under most scenarios for completion of the initiated recounts, Bush would have won the election, but Gore would have won using the most generous standards for undervotes.

Ultimately, a media consortium—comprising The New York Times, The Washington Post, The Wall Street Journal, Tribune Co. (parent of the Los Angeles Times), Associated Press, CNN, The Palm Beach Post and the St. Petersburg Times—hired NORC at the University of Chicago to examine 175,010 ballots collected from the entire state, not just the disputed counties that were recounted; these ballots contained undervotes (ballots with no machine-detected choice made for president) and overvotes (ballots with more than one choice marked). Their goal was to determine the reliability and accuracy of the systems used for the voting process. Based on the NORC review, the media group concluded that if the disputes over all the ballots in question had been resolved by applying statewide any of five standards that would have met Florida's legal standard for recounts, the electoral result would have been reversed and Gore would have won by 60 to 171 votes. (Any analysis of NORC data requires, for each punch ballot, at least two of the three ballot reviewers' codes to agree or instead, for all three to agree.) For all undervotes and overvotes statewide, these five standards are:

- Prevailing standard – accepts at least one detached corner of a chad and all affirmative marks on optical scan ballots.
- County-by-county standard – applies each county's own standards independently.
- Two-corner standard – accepts at least two detached corners of a chad and all affirmative marks on optical scan ballots.
- Most restrictive standard – accepts only so-called perfect ballots that machines somehow missed and did not count, or ballots with unambiguous expressions of voter intent.
- Most inclusive standard – applies uniform criteria of "dimple or better" on punch marks and all affirmative marks on optical scan ballots.

Such a statewide review including all uncounted votes was a tangible possibility, as Leon County Circuit Court Judge Terry Lewis, whom the Florida Supreme Court had assigned to oversee the statewide recount, had scheduled a hearing for December 13 (mooted by the U.S. Supreme Court's final ruling on the 12th) to consider the question of including overvotes as well as undervotes. Subsequent statements by Lewis and internal court documents support the likelihood of including overvotes in the recount. Florida State University professor of public policy Lance deHaven-Smith observed that, even considering only undervotes, "under any of the five most reasonable interpretations of the Florida Supreme Court ruling, Gore does, in fact, more than make up the deficit". Fairness and Accuracy in Reporting's analysis of the NORC study and media coverage of it supports these interpretations and criticizes the coverage of the study by media outlets such as The New York Times and the other media consortium members.

Further, according to sociologists Christopher Uggen and Jeff Manza, the 2000 election might have gone to Gore if the disenfranchised population of Florida had voted. Florida law disenfranchises convicted felons, requiring individual applications to regain suffrage. In a 2002 American Sociological Review article, Uggen and Manza found that the released felon vote could have altered the outcome of seven senatorial races between 1978 and 2000, and the 2000 presidential election. Matt Ford noted their study concluded, "if the state's 827,000 disenfranchised felons had voted at the same rate as other Floridians, Democratic candidate Al Gore would have won Florida—and the presidency—by more than 80,000 votes." The effect of Florida's law is such that in 2014, purportedly "[m]ore than one in ten Floridians—and nearly one in four African-American Floridians—are shut out of the polls because of felony convictions."

=== Voting machines ===
Because the 2000 presidential election was so close in Florida, the federal government and state governments pushed for election reform to be prepared by the 2004 presidential election. Many of Florida's 2000 election night problems stemmed from usability and ballot design factors with voting systems, including the potentially confusing "butterfly ballot." Many voters had difficulties with the paper-based punch card voting machines and were either unable to understand the voting process or unable to perform it. This resulted in an unusual number of overvotes (voting for more candidates than is allowed) and undervotes (voting for fewer than the minimum candidates, including none at all). Many undervotes were caused by voter error, unmaintained punch card voting booths, or errors having to do merely with the characteristics of punch card ballots (resulting in hanging, dimpled, or pregnant chads).

Post-election analyses of Florida voting data found higher rates of ballot spoilage in Florida counties with larger numbers of African Americans, especially in Duval County, with its "caterpillar ballot", in which the presidential section stretched across multiple pages.

A proposed solution to these problems was the installation of modern electronic voting machines. The 2000 presidential election spurred the debate about election and voting reform but did not end it.

In the aftermath of the election, the Help America Vote Act (HAVA) was passed to help states upgrade their election technology in the hopes of preventing similar problems in future elections. But the electronic voting systems that many states purchased to comply with HAVA actually caused problems in the 2004 presidential election.

=== Exit polling and declaration of vote winners ===
The Voter News Service's reputation was damaged by its treatment of Florida's presidential vote in 2000. Breaking its own guidelines, VNS called the state as a win for Gore 12 minutes before polls closed in the Florida Panhandle. Although most of the state is in the Eastern Time Zone, counties in the Panhandle, in the Central Time Zone, had not yet closed their polls. Discrepancies between the results of exit polls and the actual vote count caused the VNS to change its call twice, first from Gore to Bush and then to "too close to call." Due in part to this (and other polling inaccuracies) the VNS was disbanded in 2003.

According to Bush adviser Karl Rove, exit polls early in the afternoon on election day showed Gore winning by three percentage points, but when the networks called the state for Gore, Bush led by about 75,000 votes in raw tallies from the Florida Secretary of State.

Charges of media bias were leveled against the networks by Republicans, who claimed that the networks called states more quickly for Al Gore than for George W. Bush. Congress held hearings on this matter, at which the networks claimed to have no intentional bias in their election night reporting. A study of the calls made on election night 2000 indicated that states carried by Gore were called more quickly than states won by Bush; however, notable states carried by Bush, such as New Hampshire and Florida, were very close, and close states won by Gore, such as Iowa, Oregon, New Mexico and Wisconsin, were called late as well.

The early call of Florida for Gore has been alleged to have cost Bush several close states, including Iowa, New Mexico, Oregon, and Wisconsin. In each of these states, Gore won by less than 10,000 votes, and the polls closed after the networks called Florida for Gore. Because the Florida call was widely seen as an indicator that Gore had won the election, researcher John Lott claimed that the call depressed Republican turnout in the western Florida Panhandle during its final minutes of voting, which could have led to slim margins by which Gore carried several states. Lott's survey assumed that the turnout in the western Panhandle counties, which was 65%, would have equaled the statewide average of 68% if the state had not been called for Gore while the polls were open. But the smaller turnout in the Panhandle has been attributed to the surge in the black vote elsewhere in Florida to 16% of the total from 10% of the total in 1996. Research by Henry Brady and David Collier strongly disputes Lott's findings. Brady and Collier sharply criticize Lott's methodology and claim that when all relevant factors are accounted for, the early call likely cost Bush only between 28 and 56 votes.

=== Ralph Nader spoiler controversy ===
Many Gore supporters claimed that Green Party nominee Ralph Nader acted as a spoiler in the election, under the presumption that Nader voters would have voted for Gore had Nader not been in the race. Nader received 2.74% of the popular vote nationwide, including 97,000 votes in Florida (by comparison, there were 111,251 overvotes) and 22,000 in New Hampshire, where Bush beat Gore by 7,000 votes. Winning either state would have made Gore president. Dan Perkins agreed and said that the margin in Florida was small enough that Democrats could blame any number of third-party candidates for the defeat, including Workers World Party candidate Monica Moorehead, who received 1,500 votes.

Nader's reputation was hurt by this perception, which may have hindered his goals as an activist. For example, Mother Jones wrote about the so-called "rank-and-file liberals" who saw Nader negatively after the election and pointed out that Public Citizen, the organization Nader founded in 1971, suffered a drop in contributions. Mother Jones also cited a Public Citizen letter sent out to people interested in Nader's relation with the organization at that time, with the disclaimer: "Although Ralph Nader was our founder, he has not held an official position in the organization since 1980 and does not serve on the board. Public Citizen—and the other groups that Mr. Nader founded—act independently."

=== Press influence on race ===
In their 2007 book The Nightly News Nightmare: Network Television's Coverage of US Presidential Elections, 1988–2004, professors Stephen J. Farnsworth and S. Robert Lichter said that most media outlets influenced the outcome of the election through the use of horse race journalism. Some liberal supporters of Al Gore argued that the media had a bias against Gore and in favor of Bush. Peter Hart and Jim Naureckas, two commentators for Fairness and Accuracy in Reporting (FAIR), called the media "serial exaggerators" and took the view that several media outlets were constantly exaggerating criticism of Gore: they further argued that the media falsely claimed Gore lied when he claimed he spoke in an overcrowded science class in Sarasota, Florida, and that the media gave Bush a pass on certain issues, such as Bush allegedly exaggerating how much money he signed into the annual Texas state budget to help the uninsured during his second debate with Gore in October 2000. In the April 2000 issue of Washington Monthly, columnist Robert Parry wrote that media outlets exaggerated Gore's supposed claim that he "discovered" the Love Canal neighborhood in Niagara Falls, New York during a campaign speech in Concord, New Hampshire on November 30, 1999, when he had only claimed he "found" it after it was already evacuated in 1978 because of chemical contamination. Rolling Stone columnist Eric Boehlert also alleged media outlets exaggerated criticism of Gore as early as July 22, 1999, when Gore, known for being an environmentalist, had a friend release 500 million gallons of water into a drought-stricken river to help keep his boat afloat for a photo shoot; Boehlert claimed that media outlets exaggerated the actual number of gallons that were released, as they claimed it was 4 billion.

=== Effects on future elections and the Supreme Court ===
A number of subsequent articles have characterized the election in 2000, and the Supreme Court's decision in Bush v. Gore, as damaging the reputation of the Supreme Court, increasing the view of judges as partisan, and decreasing Americans' trust in the integrity of elections. The number of lawsuits brought over election issues more than doubled following the 2000 election cycle, an increase Richard L. Hasen of UC Irvine School of Law attributes to the "Florida fiasco".

=== Westgate voter intimidation controversy ===
In 2012, Westgate Resorts owner David A. Siegel admitted to surveying 8,000 Westgate employees nationwide and ensuring that those who supported Gore would not vote. Siegel, whose corporation was also based in Florida, acknowledged that his actions may have illegally blocked votes for Gore and ensured that Bush won the state.

== Analysis ==
The 2000 presidential election saw an increase in the urban-rural political divide and caused regional realignments that would evolve in the 21st century. Bush made major gains in most counties, particularly outside urban areas. The District of Columbia and every state except Maryland shifted rightward from the 1996 presidential election. The next time such a uniform shift occurred was in the 2024 presidential election, when every state, every Congressional District with electoral votes except Nebraska's 2nd congressional district, and D.C. shifted rightward from the 2020 presidential election.

Except in 2008, no major-party ticket has won fewer than 200 electoral votes in any 21st-century election. None has surpassed George H. W. Bush's 426 electoral votes and 7.7% popular-vote margin in 1988. Gore's popular-vote margin of 0.5% remains the lowest of any presidential election since 2000.

=== Demographic swings ===
The demographic swings in the 2000 presidential election foreshadowed realignments that continued to evolve. It was the first election in which whites without college degrees voted significantly more Republican than college-educated whites, though income was still a key dividing line. In 2016, education replaced income as the political dividing line among whites. By 2024, education had replaced income among all voters except Black voters.

Non-college whites swung toward Bush, which fueled his gains in the South. According to Split Ticket estimates, Bush won non-college whites by 17 points and college-educated whites by 9 points, winning whites as a whole by 13 points. Bush also made large gains with Hispanic voters and did even better among them in 2004. For example, Bush gained in Miami-Dade County, Florida, helping him win the state. Bush also nearly won New Mexico. Gore did well with African American voters, though it was not enough to win any Southern state. He also marginally improved among white women with college degrees, which foreshadowed increased Democratic strength in that demographic.

=== States become Republican stronghold ===
Red states, along with the year since which they have been red. All states colored on this map have been red since at least 2016.

The 2000 presidential election marked the permanent realignment of most of the Southern United States to the Republican Party at the presidential level. In addition to his home state of Tennessee, Gore lost every Southern state despite the closeness of the electoral vote and popular vote. Gore's performance in the South was similar to that of Michael Dukakis in 1988, even as Gore won the popular vote by 0.5% and Dukakis lost it by 7.7%.

No Democratic presidential nominee has won Alaska, Idaho, Utah, Wyoming, North Dakota, South Dakota, Nebraska (excluding Nebraska's 2nd congressional district), Kansas, or Oklahoma since 1964. None has won South Carolina, Alabama, Mississippi, or Texas since 1976. None has won Louisiana, Arkansas, Missouri, Tennessee, Kentucky, or West Virginia since 1996. Gore suffered particularly steep losses in Appalachia and the Upper South, which foreshadowed Democrats' 21st-century performance in those regions. For example, Dukakis won West Virginia in 1988, but Gore lost it, and it became one of the nation's most reliably Republican states thereafter.

Virginia has supported the Democratic nominee in every presidential election since 2008. But every winning Republican presidential ticket has carried all the other ten former Confederate states in every 21st-century presidential election.

In 2008, Barack Obama won Virginia, North Carolina, and Florida, and in 2012 he won Virginia and Florida. In 2020, Joe Biden won Virginia and Georgia, the only 21st-century Democratic presidential nominee to win a Deep South state.

=== States become Democratic stronghold ===
Gore held up well in the Midwest, losing only two states Bill Clinton won in 1996, Ohio (by 3.51%) and Missouri (by 3.34%). He won Wisconsin by 0.22% and Iowa by 0.32%. Gore's performance in the Midwest later inspired the phrase "blue wall", referring to states that voted for Democratic presidential nominees from 1992 to 2012.

The 2000 presidential election also marked the realignment of much of the Western United States, particularly the West Coast, toward the Democratic Party. The West Coast was competitive at the time, with Gore winning California by 12% and Washington by 5.5%.

Gore narrowly won Oregon (by 0.44%) and New Mexico (by 0.06%), the latter of which was actually closer in raw votes than Florida. California was believed to be competitive at the time and Bush campaigned there, but Gore won it by double digits. Democratic nominees have won Oregon in all 21st-century presidential elections. Bush won Colorado and New Mexico in 2004, the last time a Republican presidential nominee has won either state.

Bush won both Nevada and Arizona. This election was the last time Nevada voted for the popular-vote loser. It has voted for the popular-vote winner in all subsequent presidential elections, the longest streak of any U.S. state. Arizona stayed Republican except in 2020, when it narrowly voted for Joe Biden.

The 2000 presidential election was much less of a realignment in the Northeastern United States. Bush won New Hampshire by 1.27% and lost all other northeastern states. This was the last time any New England state voted Republican, although Donald Trump won Maine's 2nd congressional district in all three of his runs.

== See also ==
- Newspaper endorsements in the 2000 United States presidential election
- 2000 United States gubernatorial elections
- 2000 United States House of Representatives elections
- 2000 United States Senate elections
- First inauguration of George W. Bush
- List of close election results
- National Popular Vote Interstate Compact
- Ralph Nader's presidential campaigns
- 1987 Philippine Senate election, where a vote recount for the 24th Senate seat was held for three months until the Supreme Court ordered its termination in favor of Juan Ponce Enrile
