= Orrin Hatch 2000 presidential campaign =

American political campaign

Orrin Hatch 2000
- Campaign: 2000 United States presidential election
- Candidate: Orrin Hatch; United States Senator from Utah (1977–2019)
- Affiliation: Republican Party
- Status: Dropped out on January 26, 2000
- Announced: July 1, 1999

Website
- www.orrinhatch.org (Archived on November 28, 1999)

The 2000 presidential campaign of Orrin Hatch, a U.S. senator from Utah, officially began on July 1, 1999, with the establishment of an exploratory committee. Hatch had been a senator since 1977 and at the time of his announcement he was a high-ranking official on several Senate committees, most notably the chairman for the Senate Judiciary Committee. He had established himself as a conservative Republican who was known to work with liberal Democrats on major bipartisan bills, such as the 1997 Children's Health Insurance Program bill. From the beginning of his campaign, Hatch stressed his experience in federal government and attacked the perceived lack of experience of the Republican frontrunner, Texas governor George W. Bush. However, numerous commentators noted that Hatch's campaign was unlikely to succeed, due to his late entry into the race and Bush's dominant position in fundraising and opinion polling. Throughout his campaign, Hatch struggled to raise money and consistently polled in the single digits. In January 2000, he came in last place in the Iowa caucuses and announced on January 26 that he was ending his campaign, supporting eventual nominee Bush, who would go on to win the 2000 United States presidential election. Hatch remained in the Senate for several more years following his campaign and in 2015, as the most senior member of the Senate, he became the president pro tempore. In 2019, he decided to retire, ending his 42-year career as the most senior Republican senator ever before dying in 2022.

== Background ==
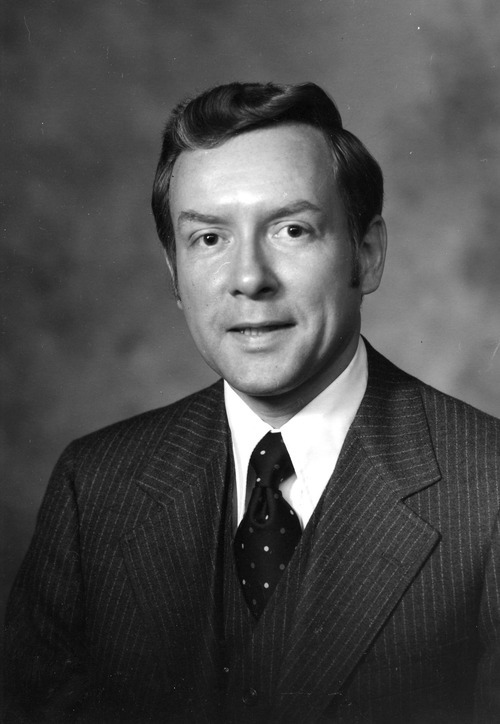
Official Senate photo of Orrin Hatch, 1977

Orrin Grant Hatch was born in 1934 in Homestead, Pennsylvania. In 1959, he graduated with an undergraduate degree in history from Brigham Young University, and in 1962 he received a Juris Doctor from the University of Pittsburgh School of Law. Following this, he began to practice law in Pennsylvania. He later moved to Utah, where he continued to practice law in Salt Lake City. An active member of the Church of Jesus Christ of Latter-day Saints, Hatch was a Mormon missionary in 1954 and later would serve as both a bishop and a stake high councilor.

In 1976, Hatch ran as a Republican nominee in that year's United States Senate election and won with a campaign that, according to the Deseret News, was based on the "guiding principles of limited government, tax restraint and integrity in public service". In the Senate, Hatch held positions on several committees, including as the chairman for the Judiciary. Hatch was a noted conservative and was influential in confirming numerous conservative federal judges, including Supreme Court nominee Clarence Thomas in 1991. However, Hatch also worked extensively with Senator Ted Kennedy, a liberal Democrat, on several pieces of bipartisan legislation, such as the Children's Health Insurance Program bill in 1997. A 1999 article from The New York Times stated that, while Hatch was still a conservative, he had taken a more centrist view on issues regarding children and health. According to the Times, these positions had alienated Hatch from some of the more conservative members of the Republican Party, with Representative Henry Hyde, a fellow Republican, saying, "He is not a movement conservative". While Hatch had considered running for president in the 1980s and 1990s, he ultimately decided against it, as he did not wish to run against fellow Republican candidates Ronald Reagan, George H. W. Bush, or Bob Dole in their campaigns.

== Campaign developments ==
=== Expressed interest ===
Throughout 1999, Hatch expressed interest in seeking the Republican Party's nomination for the 2000 United States presidential election. Earlier that year, the Utah State Legislature amended an election law that would allow him to run for president and also campaign for re-election to his Senate seat, and a June 1999 article in The Salt Lake Tribune stated that Hatch had expressed interest in running at a state Republican convention. On June 22, 1999, Hatch, speaking to reporters at the United States Capitol, announced his intention to run for president. In the announcement, Hatch highlighted his experience working with members of both the Democratic and Republican parties to pass legislation in the Senate and stated that he would address issues regarding Medicare, Social Security, and "a racial breakdown in the country" if elected president of the United States. Hatch also stated that the most important issue at stake in the election regarded the president's ability to nominate federal judges and claimed that he had more experience with the judiciary than any of the other candidates. While Hatch conceded that Texas Governor George W. Bush was at that time considered the party's frontrunner, he positioned himself as an alternative to Bush, saying it would be good "to have someone who is not beholden to the Republican establishment". At the time of his announcement, several other Republicans had already entered the race, including former Vice President Dan Quayle, Senators John McCain and Bob Smith, Representative John Kasich, and former Tennessee Governor Lamar Alexander. Addressing this, Hatch stated, "I know it's late, but I don't think it's too late". Due to his late entry into the race, some commentators believed that Hatch was running in order to secure a position from whoever the actual Republican nominee would be, such as their pick for running mate, Supreme Court justice nominee, or attorney general, though Hatch denied these allegations. At the time of his announcement, he stated that an official announcement regarding his plans to run would be made soon.

=== Exploratory committee ===
On July 1, Hatch officially announced his candidacy, filing a statement of candidacy with the Federal Election Commission and forming an exploratory committee. While officially campaigning for the presidential nomination, Hatch also began to run for re-election to the Senate, as his current term was set to expire in January 2001. The following month, Hatch finished in last place among the nine candidates who had participated in the Iowa Straw Poll, and he similarly finished last in another straw poll held in Alabama behind radio talk show host Alan Keyes, the two of them being the only candidates who participated. By October, Hatch had raised approximately $1 million in campaign funding, less than two percent of the $56 million that Bush had raised by that time. Journalist David Rosenbaum stated that Hatch was "running seemingly quixotically" and stated that almost no Republicans believed he would win the nomination. However, according to Hatch's chief strategist Sal Russo, Hatch believed that Bush's lead would falter, which would allow him to go after former supporters of his. Hatch anticipated that the Republican nomination would likely come down to himself, Bush, and McCain, while the Democratic Party would likely nominate either Bill Bradley or Al Gore.

By December, Hatch had raised $1.3 million, far behind frontrunners Bush ($57.7 million), businessman Steve Forbes ($20.6 million), and McCain ($9.4 million). That month, Hatch, Keyes, and Gary Bauer were the only three candidates to attend a rally in Manchester, New Hampshire, that was hosted by the Gun Owners of New Hampshire. An article in The New York Times stated that all three candidates were polling at about one percent each in opinion polls, while Richard Bond, a former chairman of the Republican National Committee, wrote an op-ed for the paper calling for them to drop out of the race, saying, "The truth is that Orrin Hatch, Alan Keyes and Gary Bauer have had ample time to establish themselves as viable candidates, and they have failed". Around the same time, Hatch alleged that his poor performance in the race so far may have been due to anti-Mormonism amongst the news media and voters at large. If elected, Hatch would be the first Mormon to serve as the United States president, though a recent Gallup Poll had shown that 17 percent of Americans would not consider a person for the presidency if they were a Mormon. In December, the Chicago Tribune reported that one of Hatch's goals if elected would be to abolish the Internal Revenue Service and replace it with a new tax system.

=== Iowa caucuses and withdrawal ===
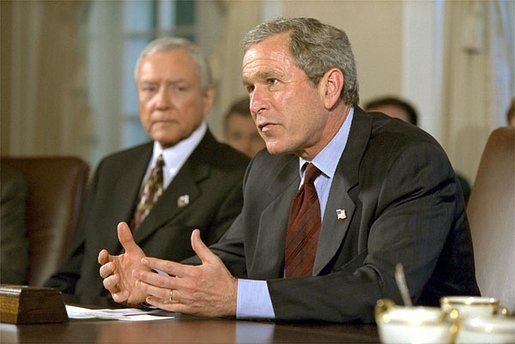
Hatch (left) finished the Iowa caucuses far behind winner George W. Bush (right), who would go on to secure the Republican nomination and eventually the presidency.

Entering into 2000, Hatch continued to trail other candidates in both polling and fundraising. With the Iowa caucuses approaching, Hatch and his campaign stated that they were hoping to place finish in fourth place, with the campaign believing that a better showing than that was very unlikely. At the time, he was polling between zero and two percent in the state. On Monday, January 24, Hatch finished in sixth place in the caucuses with less than 1,000 votes, coming in last place and receiving just one percent of the vote. Bush finished first, followed by Forbes, Keyes, and Bauer, the latter of whom received nine percent of the vote. McCain, who did not actively campaign in Iowa, finished ahead of Hatch with five percent of the vote. Hatch left the state that same day, before all the votes had been counted and without making a public appearance. While he planned to have a press conference in Washington, D.C. the following day, a snowstorm prevented this from occurring. That same day, The New York Times reported that Hatch had decided to drop out of the race and was planning a rescheduled press conference for January 26, in the hearing room of the Senate Judiciary Committee. On January 26, Hatch announced that he was withdrawing from the race, citing his last-place finish in the Iowa caucuses. He stated that he would support Bush for the nomination and opined that his late entry into the race may have led to his poor performance. During his speech, he stated that, while he had wondered if the snowstorm the prior day had been a sign from God to continue to campaign, his wife had told him, "No, the Iowa caucuses were the sign from God".

== Aftermath ==
Following his withdrawal, Hatch continued to serve as the chairman for the Senate Judiciary Committee. In an interview with CNN during the 2000 Republican National Convention, he reiterated his support for Republican nominee Bush and expressed doubt that Bush, if elected, would pick him as his attorney general. Bush was ultimately elected president, while Hatch was reelected to the Senate. In 2015, Hatch, by then the most senior member of the Senate, became the president pro tempore of the Senate, making him the third in the line of presidential succession. He was an ardent supporter of President Donald Trump and, in 2018, he was influential in the confirmation of Supreme Court nominee Brett Kavanaugh. In 2018, despite urges from Trump to seek reelection, Hatch announced that he would retire at the end of his term the following year, ending his 42-year career as a senator. He was succeeded in that position by Mitt Romney, a fellow Mormon and Republican whom Hatch had supported in a failed bid for the presidency in 2012. Hatch's lengthy time in office made him the longest-serving Republican senator in history. He died in 2022 at the age of 88.
