= Newspaper endorsements in the 2000 United States presidential election =

The following table is the list of newspaper endorsements in the 2000 United States presidential election. It mostly contains major and small city newspapers of 2000, which made their presidential endorsement from September–November 2000.

== List ==
Newspaper	2000 endorsement	Endorsement date	City	State	Type	1996 endorsement	Reference(s)	
Newspaper	2000 endorsement	Endorsement date	City	State	Type	1996 endorsement	2000	1996
Agri News	George W. Bush	October 26	Rochester	Minnesota	Weekly	Bob Dole		
Akron Beacon Journal	Al Gore	October 22	Akron	Ohio	Daily	Bill Clinton		
Albuquerque Journal	George W. Bush	October 29	Albuquerque	New Mexico	Daily	Bob Dole		
The Albuquerque Tribune	George W. Bush	October 30	Albuquerque	New Mexico	Daily	Bob Dole		
Arizona Daily Star	Al Gore	October 29	Tucson	Arizona	Daily	Bill Clinton		
The Arizona Republic	George W. Bush	October 29	Phoenix	Arizona	Daily	Bob Dole		
The Atlanta Constitution	Al Gore	October 20	Atlanta	Georgia	Daily	Bill Clinton		
The Atlanta Journal	George W. Bush	October 19	Atlanta	Georgia	Daily	Bob Dole		
Austin American-Statesman	George W. Bush	October 22	Austin	Texas	Daily	Bill Clinton		
Bangor Daily News	George W. Bush	November 4	Bangor	Maine	Daily	Bob Dole		
The Blade	Al Gore	October 29	Toledo	Ohio	Daily	Bill Clinton		
The Buffalo News	Al Gore	October 29	Buffalo	New York	Daily	Bill Clinton		
Call and Post	Al Gore	November 2	Cleveland	Ohio	Weekly	Bill Clinton		
The Capital Times	Al Gore	November 3	Madison	Wisconsin	Daily	Bill Clinton		
The Charlotte Observer	Al Gore	October 29	Charlotte	North Carolina	Daily	Bill Clinton		
Chicago Tribune	George W. Bush	October 29	Chicago	Illinois	Daily	Bob Dole		
The Cincinnati Enquirer	George W. Bush	October 29	Cincinnati	Ohio	Daily	Bob Dole		
Citrus County Chronicle	Al Gore	October 29	Inverness	Florida	Daily	Bill Clinton		
The Columbian	George W. Bush	October 22	Vancouver	Washington	Daily	Bill Clinton		
The Commercial Appeal	George W. Bush	October 29	Memphis	Tennessee	Daily	Bob Dole		
Connecticut Post	George W. Bush	October 29	Bridgeport	Connecticut	Daily	Bob Dole		
The Courier	George W. Bush	November 5	Houma	Louisiana	Daily	None		
Daily News	Al Gore	October 29	New York City	New York	Daily	Bill Clinton		
The Daily Nonpareil	George W. Bush	November 5	Council Bluffs	Iowa	Daily	Unknown		
The Dallas Morning News	George W. Bush	October 22	Dallas	Texas	Daily	Bob Dole		
The Des Moines Register	Al Gore	October 29	Des Moines	Iowa	Daily	Bill Clinton		
Detroit Free Press	Al Gore	October 20	Detroit	Michigan	Daily	Bill Clinton		
The Detroit News	George W. Bush	October 22	Detroit	Michigan	Daily	Bob Dole		
El Paso Times	George W. Bush	October 22	El Paso	Texas	Daily	Bill Clinton		
The Flint Journal	George W. Bush	October 29	Flint	Michigan	Daily	Bill Clinton		
The Florida Times-Union	George W. Bush	October 28	Jacksonville	Florida	Daily	Bob Dole		
The Forum	George W. Bush	November 5	Fargo	North Dakota	Daily	Bob Dole		
Grand Forks Herald	Al Gore	October 29	Grand Forks	North Dakota	Daily	None		
The Greenville News	George W. Bush	November 5	Greenville	South Carolina	Daily	Bob Dole		
Hartford Courant	George W. Bush	October 29	Hartford	Connecticut	Daily	Bill Clinton		
The Herald	Al Gore	October 22	Everett	Washington	Daily	Bill Clinton		
Herald & Review	George W. Bush	October 29	Decatur	Illinois	Daily	Bob Dole		
Herald News	Al Gore	October 29	Passaic	New Jersey	Daily	Bob Dole		
Home News Tribune	Al Gore	October 30	New Brunswick	New Jersey	Daily	Unknown		
Homer News	Al Gore	November 2	Homer	Alaska	Weekly	Bill Clinton		
The Honolulu Advertiser	Al Gore	October 29	Honolulu	Hawaii	Daily	Bill Clinton		
Honolulu Star-Bulletin	Al Gore	November 2	Honolulu	Hawaii	Daily	Bill Clinton		
Houston Chronicle	George W. Bush	October 8	Houston	Texas	Daily	Bob Dole		
The Huntsville Times	Al Gore	October 29	Huntsville	Alabama	Daily	Bill Clinton		
The Indianapolis Star	George W. Bush	October 29	Indianapolis	Indiana	Daily	Bob Dole		
Intelligencer Journal	Al Gore	November 3	Lancaster	Pennsylvania	Daily	Bill Clinton		
Iowa City Press-Citizen	Al Gore	October 21	Iowa City	Iowa	Daily	Bill Clinton		
Journal Star	George W. Bush	October 29	Peoria	Illinois	Daily	Bob Dole		
Kearney Hub	George W. Bush	November 2	Kearney	Nebraska	Daily	Bob Dole		
The Knoxville News-Sentinel	George W. Bush	October 29	Knoxville	Tennessee	Daily	Bob Dole		
La Opinión	Al Gore	November 4	Los Angeles	California	Daily	Bill Clinton		
Lexington Herald-Leader	Al Gore	October 8	Lexington	Kentucky	Daily	Bill Clinton		
Midland Daily News	George W. Bush	October 29	Midland	Michigan	Daily	Bob Dole		
Montgomery Advertiser	Al Gore	October 23	Montgomery	Alabama	Daily	Bob Dole		
Naples Daily News	George W. Bush	October 29	Naples	Florida	Daily	Bob Dole		
New Pittsburgh Courier	Al Gore	November 4	Pittsburgh	Pennsylvania	Twice-weekly	Bill Clinton		
The New York Times	Al Gore	October 29	New York City	New York	Daily	Bill Clinton		
The News & Advance	George W. Bush	October 29	Lynchburg	Virginia	Daily	Bob Dole		
The News-Times	Al Gore	November 5	Danbury	Connecticut	Daily	Bill Clinton		
Newsday	George W. Bush	October 29	Melville	New York	Daily	Bill Clinton		
The North Platte Telegraph	None	October 29	North Platte	Nebraska	Daily	None (Note: The North Platte Telegraph didn't announce its endorsement for the 1996 presidential election.)		
Okmulgee Daily Times	Al Gore	November 2	Okmulgee	Oklahoma	Daily	Unknown		
The Olathe Daily News	Al Gore	October 26	Olathe	Kansas	Daily	Bob Dole		
The Olympian	Al Gore	November 4	Olympia	Washington	Daily	Bill Clinton		
The Oregonian	George W. Bush	October 29	Portland	Oregon	Daily	Bill Clinton		
Oshkosh Northwestern	George W. Bush	October 22	Oshkosh	Wisconsin	Daily	Bob Dole		
Palladium-Item	George W. Bush	October 29	Richmond	Indiana	Daily	Bob Dole		
Philadelphia Daily News	Al Gore	October 27	Philadelphia	Pennsylvania	Daily	Bill Clinton		
The Philadelphia Inquirer	Al Gore	October 29	Philadelphia	Pennsylvania	Daily	Bill Clinton		
Pittsburgh Post-Gazette	Al Gore	October 29	Pittsburgh	Pennsylvania	Daily	Bill Clinton		
The Plain Dealer	George W. Bush	October 22	Cleveland	Ohio	Daily	Bill Clinton		
Plainview Daily Herald	George W. Bush	October 29	Plainview	Texas	Daily	Bob Dole		
Post-Bulletin	Al Gore	October 28	Rochester	Minnesota	Daily	Bill Clinton		
The Press of Atlantic City	George W. Bush	November 3	Atlantic City	New Jersey	Daily	None		
Quad-City Times	George W. Bush	October 29	Davenport	Iowa	Daily	Unknown		
The Sun	Al Gore	October 29	Baltimore	Maryland	Daily	None		
The Recorder	Al Gore	October 28	Greenfield	Massachusetts	Daily	Bill Clinton		
The Register-Guard	Al Gore	October 22	Eugene	Oregon	Daily	Bill Clinton		
Richmond Times-Dispatch	George W. Bush	October 22	Richmond	Virginia	Daily	Bob Dole		
The Rock Island Argus	George W. Bush	November 5	Rock Island	Illinois	Daily	Bob Dole		
Rockford Register Star	George W. Bush	October 29	Rockford	Illinois	Daily	Bob Dole		
The Sacramento Bee	Al Gore	October 22	Sacramento	California	Daily	Bill Clinton		
San Francisco Chronicle	Al Gore	October 22	San Francisco	California	Daily	Bill Clinton		
San Francisco Examiner	Al Gore	October 8	San Francisco	California	Daily	Bill Clinton		
South Bend Tribune	None	November 5	South Bend	Indiana	Daily	Bill Clinton		
Springfield Union-News	Al Gore	October 29	Springfield	Massachusetts	Daily	Bill Clinton		
St. Joseph News-Press	George W. Bush	November 5	St. Joseph	Missouri	Daily	Bob Dole		
St. Petersburg Times	Al Gore	October 29	St. Petersburg	Florida	Daily	Bill Clinton		
St. Louis Post-Dispatch	Al Gore	October 22	St. Louis	Missouri	Daily	Bill Clinton		
San Antonio Express-News	George W. Bush	October 22	San Antonio	Texas	Daily	Bob Dole		
Seattle Gay News	Al Gore	October 27	Seattle	Washington	Weekly	None		
Star-Gazette	George W. Bush	October 29	Elmira	New York	Daily	Bob Dole		
The State	George W. Bush	October 29	Columbia	South Carolina	Daily	Bob Dole		
The State Journal-Register	George W. Bush	October 29	Springfield	Illinois	Daily	Bob Dole		
The Tennessean	Al Gore	October 22	Nashville	Tennessee	Daily	Bill Clinton		
The Times	Al Gore	October 29	Trenton	New Jersey	Daily	Bill Clinton		
Times Recorder	George W. Bush	October 23	Zanesville	Ohio	Daily	Bob Dole		
The Truth	None	November 5	Elkhart	Indiana	Daily	Bob Dole		
Tulsa World	George W. Bush	October 24	Tulsa	Oklahoma	Daily	Bob Dole		
Tucson Citizen	Al Gore	November 2	Tucson	Arizona	Daily	Bob Dole		
Tyler Morning Telegraph	George W. Bush	November 5	Tyler	Texas	Daily	Bob Dole		
The Victoria Advocate	George W. Bush	October 22	Victoria	Texas	Daily	Bob Dole		
Waco Tribune-Herald	George W. Bush	October 22	Waco	Texas	Daily	Bill Clinton		
Walla Walla Union-Bulletin	George W. Bush	October 29	Walla Walla	Washington	Daily	Bill Clinton		
Winston-Salem Journal	George W. Bush	October 29	Winston-Salem	North Carolina	Daily	Bob Dole		
Wisconsin State Journal	George W. Bush	October 29	Madison	Wisconsin	Daily	Bob Dole		
Xenia Daily Gazette	None (Note: The Xenia Daily Gazette didn't announce its endorsement for the 2000 presidential election.)	November 6	Xenia	Ohio	Daily	Bill Clinton		

== See also ==
- 2000 United States presidential election
- George W. Bush 2000 presidential campaign
- Al Gore 2000 presidential campaign
