= 2004 United States election voting controversies =

During the 2004 United States elections, there was controversy around various aspects of the voting process, including whether voting had been made accessible to all those entitled to vote, whether ineligible voters were registered, whether voters were registered multiple times, and whether the votes cast had been correctly counted.

There was generally less attention paid to the Senate and House elections and to various state races, but some of them were also questioned, especially the gubernatorial election in Washington, which was decided by less than 0.01% and involved several recounts and lawsuits. The final recount also reversed the outcome of this election.

== Voting difficulties ==
=== Voter registration ===
In the months leading up to the 2004 election, both parties made efforts to register new voters. In some cases, Republicans challenged or prepared to challenge the validity of many new registrations, citing instances of fictitious names such as Mary Poppins appearing on the voter rolls.

There were also complaints about the rejection of registrations by government agencies. College students encountered difficulties in registering where they attended school. Some officials rejected voter registration forms on grounds that were contested, such as a failure to use paper of a particular weight (in Ohio) or a failure to check a box on the form (Florida).

A New York Daily News article alleged 46,000 people were registered to vote in both New York City and Florida. A Cleveland Plain Dealer article identified 27,000 people possibly registered in both Ohio and Florida, with 400 possibly voting in both states consistently in the previous four years. The articles attempted to match voter rolls to each other, which probably did not produce accurate results due to similarity of names.

=== Voter intimidation ===
Court injunctions were placed by the Franklin County Common Pleas Court against MoveOn for verbally threatening and harassing individuals who identified themselves as Republican. On October 5, a Bush-Cheney campaign volunteer in Orlando had his arm broken when trying to stop union activists from storming the campaign office. The "storming" was part of a massive simultaneous campaign against 20 pro-Republican headquarters.

=== Practical impediments ===
In every election, some voters encounter practical impediments to voting, such as long lines at the polling place. In 2004, however, the issue received increased attention. In many places, some voters had to wait several hours to vote. Ohio voters, in particular, were plagued by this issue. A study conducted by the Democratic National Committee in the summer of 2005 found that long lines forced three percent of the state's registered voters to abstain. These impediments led to protests over the outcome, but it was unlikely that the problems affected the result.

Among the factors thought to be at work were: the general increase in voter turnout; a particular increase in first-time voters whose processing required more time; and confusion about the providing of provisional ballots, which many states had never used before.

Distribution of voting machines proved to be a problem in some districts. In Ohio, some precincts had too few machines, causing long waiting times, while others had many machines per registered voters. Officials cited a late rush of registrations after voting machines had already been allocated as one source of long lines.

=== Voting machines ===
In the 2000 election, especially in the disputed recounts in Florida, there were issues concerning the ambiguities and uncertainties that arose from punch-card ballots, such as the hanging chads (incompletely punched holes). In 2004, the punch-card ballots were still widely used in some states. Most Ohio voters used punch-card ballots, and more than 90,000 ballots cast in Ohio were treated as not including a vote for president; this "undervote" could arise because the voter chose not to cast a vote or because of a malfunction of the punch-card system. Undervotes were down slightly from the 2000 election on the whole.

For the country as a whole, the voting technology used in the 2004 election breaks down as follows:

Machine type	% of ballots cast
Punch card	22.3
Lever machine	14.7
Paper ballot	1.7
Optical scan	29.6
Electronic	22.1
Mixed	9.6

Before 2004, the increasing use of electronic voting machines had raised several issues:

- Security. Without proper testing and certification, electronic voting machines could produce an incorrect report due to malfunction or deliberate manipulation.
- Recounts. Voting machine recounts should include auditing of hardware, software and the comparison of multiple vote records. Nevada was one of several states which insisted on electronic voting systems that create a paper trail.
- Partisan ties. Democrats noted the Republican or conservative ties of several leading executives in the companies providing the machines.

The state of California ordered that 15,000 of its Diebold voting machines not be used in the 2004 elections due to flaws that the company failed to disclose.

In September 2005, the Government Accountability Office released a report noting electronic voting systems hold promise for improving the election process while citing concerns about security and reliability raised by numerous groups, and detailing specific problems that have occurred.

=== Provisional and absentee ballots ===
In Ohio, Secretary of State Ken Blackwell ruled that Ohio would not count provisional ballots that were submitted at the wrong precinct. This ruling was ultimately upheld by the United States Court of Appeals for the 6th Circuit.

Absentee ballots were also an issue. There were reports of absentee ballots being mailed out too late for some voters to complete and return them in time. In Broward County, Florida, some 58,000 absentee ballots were delivered to the Postal Service to be mailed to voters, according to county election officials, but the Postal Service said it had never received them.

== Exit polls ==
According to Richard Morin of the New York Times, the 2004 election "may have finally stripped exit polling of its reputation as the crown jewel of political surveys, somehow immune from the myriad problems that affect telephone polls and other types of public opinion surveys. Instead, this face-to-face, catch-the-voters-on-the-way-out poll has been revealed for what it is: just another poll, with all the problems and imperfections endemic to the craft." Exit polls showed a higher percentage of the vote for Kerry than he actually received, leading some, including Tony Blair, Prime Minister of the United Kingdom, to conclude that Kerry won the election prematurely.

Mitofsky International, the company responsible for exit polling for the National Election Pool (NEP) and its member news organizations, released a report detailing the 2004 election's exit polling. The NEP report stated that "the size of the average exit poll error ... was higher in 2004 than in previous years for which we have data" and that exit polling estimates overstated Kerry's share of the vote in 26 states by more than one standard error and overestimated Bush's share in four states by more than one standard error. It concluded that these discrepancies between the exit polls and the official results were "most likely due to Kerry voters participating in the exit polls at a higher rate than Bush voters". The NEP report further stated that "Exit polls do not support the allegations of fraud due to rigging of voting equipment. Our analysis of the difference between the vote count and the exit poll at each polling location in our sample has found no systematic differences for precincts using touch screen and optical scan voting equipment." A study performed by the Caltech / MIT Voting Technology Project concluded that "there is no evidence, based on exit polls, that electronic voting machines were used to steal the 2004 election for President Bush."

Following the 2004 election, researchers looked at ways in which polling methodologies might be flawed and explored ways to improve polling in the future.

== Recounts and close elections ==
Ralph Nader requested a recount of 11 wards in New Hampshire where vote totals for Bush were 5–15% higher than predicted by exit polls. The Nader campaign reported that "only very minor discrepancies were found between the optical scan machine counts of the ballots and the recount. The discrepancies are similar to those found when hand-counted ballots are recounted".

Two poll workers in Cuyahoga County were convicted of preselecting ballots for recounts in Ohio.

Around the country there were also recounts of races for state and local office. Most of them reflected simply the closeness of the official tally, but some also raised issues of election irregularities. These included the elections for:

- Governor of Washington, between Dino Rossi and Christine Gregoire. Issues raised included the mailing of absentee ballots, the counting of provisional and absentee ballots, correction of improper marks on optically scanned ballots, and alleged tampering with electronic voting machines. The first tally and the first recount gave the election to Republican Dino Rossi. However, after two statewide recounts, Gregoire, the Democrat, had a narrow lead of 129 votes out of 2.8 million cast. A Republican lawsuit seeking to overturn the result and force a re-vote was rejected by the court, after which Rossi conceded the election. See Washington gubernatorial election, 2004.
- North Carolina Commissioner of Agriculture, between Britt Cobb and Steve Troxler. The number of votes lost due to a voting machine malfunction in Carteret County (over 4,000) exceed the reported margin of about 2,000. The state board of elections initially called for a new election in Cartaret County before a judge struck the idea down; a new statewide election was also struck down. The Troxler campaign attempted to gather affidavits from Cartaret County voters to establish they had won; this was mooted when Cobb, who said he wanted to "avoid the terrible precedent of settling elections by affidavit", conceded.
- Governor of Puerto Rico, between Aníbal Acevedo Vilá and Pedro Rosselló. Aníbal Acevedo-Vilá was declared the winner after several months of disputes. The two candidates were separated by just under 4,000 votes.

== Objection to certification of Ohio's electoral votes ==
After the election, many blogs published false rumors claiming to show evidence that voter fraud had prevented Kerry from winning. Unfounded conspiracy theories about the election were circulated and promoted. Conspiracy theorists argued the election was stolen, arguing that votes were switched from Democratic to Republican, that "phantom voters" voted in Ohio, that exit polls that favored Democrat John Kerry were "more accurate" than the actual result, and that voting machines were rigged to favor George W. Bush.

Although the overall result of the election was not challenged by the Kerry campaign, Green Party presidential candidate David Cobb and Libertarian Party presidential candidate Michael Badnarik obtained a recount in Ohio. This recount was completed December 28, 2004, although on January 24, 2007, a jury convicted two Ohio elections officials of selecting precincts to recount where they already knew the hand total would match the machine total, thereby avoiding having to perform a full recount. Independent candidate Ralph Nader obtained a recount in 11 New Hampshire precincts that used Accuvote voting machines.

As a result of these conspiracy theories, some Democratic members of Congress asked for investigations into the vote count. At the official counting of the electoral votes on January 6, an objection was made under the Electoral Count Act (now 3 U.S.C. § 15) to Ohio's electoral votes. Because the motion was supported by at least one member of both the House of Representatives and the Senate, the law required that the two houses separate to debate and vote on the objection. In the House of Representatives, the objection was supported by 31 Democrats. It was opposed by 178 Republicans, 88 Democrats and one independent. Not voting were 52 Republicans and 80 Democrats. Four people elected to the House had not yet taken office, and one seat was vacant. In the Senate, it was supported only by its maker, Barbara Boxer, with 74 senators opposed and 25 not voting. During the debate, no Senator argued that the outcome of the election should be changed by either court challenge or revote. Boxer claimed that she had made the motion not to challenge the outcome, but "to cast the light of truth on a flawed system which must be fixed now.".

Kerry would later state that "the widespread irregularities make it impossible to know for certain that the [Ohio] outcome reflected the will of the voters." In the same article, Democratic National Committee Chairman Howard Dean said "I'm not confident that the election in Ohio was fairly decided... We know that there was substantial voter suppression, and the machines were not reliable. It should not be a surprise that the Republicans are willing to do things that are unethical to manipulate elections. That's what we suspect has happened."

A 2005 report by Democratic House Judiciary Committee ranking member John Conyers titled What Went Wrong in Ohio claimed that "numerous serious election irregularities" and voter suppression by Republicans had caused Bush to win the state. The report was promoted by conspiracy theorists such as New York University professor Mark Crispin Miller and Robert F. Kennedy Jr., as well as by author Gore Vidal. While some courts before the election found that certain restrictive voting policies of Ohio Secretary of State Ken Blackwell were illegal, claims of voter and machine fraud swaying the election have been widely rejected and refuted. A congressional letter in 2005 support of the report was supported only by the "most liberal members of Congress" due to the "exaggerated charges" in the report.

Senate vote on the objection (3:18 pm EST on January 6, 2005)
Party	Votes for	Votes against	Not voting
Republican (55)	–	38	17
Democratic (44)	1: Barbara Boxer (D-CA)	35	8: Daniel Akaka (D-HI); Evan Bayh (D-IN); Jeff Bingaman (D-NM); Jon Corzine (D-NJ); Dianne Feinstein (D-CA); John Kerry (D-MA); Mary Landrieu (D-LA); Patty Murray (D-WA)
Independent (1)	–	1: Jim Jeffords (I-VT)	–
Total (100)	1	74	25

House vote on the objection (5:02 pm EST on January 6, 2005)
Party	Votes for	Votes against	Not voting
Republican (230)	–	178	52
Democratic (199)	31: Corrine Brown (D-FL-3); Julia Carson (D-IN-7); Lacy Clay (D-MO-1); Jim Clyburn (D-SC-6); John Conyers (D-MI-14); Danny K. Davis (D-IL-7); Lane Evans (D-IL-17); Sam Farr (D-CA-17); Bob Filner (D-CA-51); Raúl Grijalva (D-AZ-7); Alcee Hastings (D-FL-23); Maurice Hinchey (D-NY-22); Sheila Jackson Lee (D-TX-18); Jesse Jackson Jr. (D-IL-2); Eddie Bernice Johnson (D-TX-30); Stephanie Tubbs Jones (D-OH-11); Carolyn Cheeks Kilpatrick (D-MI-13); Dennis Kucinich (D-OH-10); Barbara Lee (D-CA-9); John Lewis (D-GA-5); Ed Markey (D-MA-7); Cynthia McKinney (D-GA-4); John Olver (D-MA-1); Major Owens (D-NY-11); Frank Pallone (D-NJ-6); Donald M. Payne (D-NJ-10); Jan Schakowsky (D-IL-9); Bennie Thompson (D-MS-2); Maxine Waters (D-CA-35); Diane Watson (D-CA-33); Lynn Woolsey (D-CA-6)	88	80
Independent (1)	–	1: Bernie Sanders (I-VT)	–
Total (430)	31	267	132

== See also ==
- SMARTech
- Triad GSI
- Unilect
