= SMARTech =

SMARTech (a.k.a. SmarTech or Airnet) is an American Internet hosting company based in Chattanooga, Tennessee that hosted websites for the Republican National Committee (RNC), including gwb43.com, as well as hundreds of Republican Party or anti-Barack Obama websites. As of 2011, its president and CEO was Jeff Averbeck.

== History ==
Founded as Airnet in 1994, the company initially focused on contract marketing for Republican political candidates. During the 1990s, they were one of the first companies to take advantage of email, sending over 5 million emails per hour. In 2002, expanding to include political telecommunications, they did business as SmarTech.

As of 2004, the company was working with city officials in Chattanooga to use Internet fiber to connect to Oak Ridge National Laboratory, NASA in Huntsville, Alabama, and the Arnold Engineering Development Complex.

As of 2011, SmarTech has data centers in Chattanooga, Tennessee, Atlanta, Georgia, and Washington, D.C., and planned to build data centers in Ohio and California. They have also further expanded their focus on mass communications for companies. In 2012, SmarTech had about 400 call centers across the United States.

=== 2004 United States presidential election ===
Between 2002 and 2004, the Republican Party paid SmarTech $1.5 million for hosting presidential candidate George W. Bush's website and for distributing "massive amounts of political spam." SmarTech hosted the website for the 2004 Republican National Convention, the official website for Bush's 2004 campaign, and the official website for the Republican National Committee. The company also donated to the committee that organized the convention. Averbeck had previously consulted for the RNC in 2000.

Politician and activist Kenneth Blackwell hired SmarTech, which was recommended by political consultant Michael Connell, to provide a backup server to display Ohio voting data results in case of any network issues during Election Day 2004. At 11:14 PM that night, the SmarTech website was activated. Even though no significant outages occurred, voting data was suddenly switched over to SmarTech, with the company receiving Internet traffic from county election offices by the Ohio Secretary of State's office. This change occurred at the same time that a large number of votes in Bush's favor were received.

Lawyer Cliff Arnebeck believed that the purpose of this change may havebeen to help guide Republicans to manipulate votes in specific Ohio counties.

Stephen Spoonamore, a Republican who specializes in fraud detection and computer infrastructure cybersecurity, testified in King Lincoln Bronzeville Neighborhood Ass'n v. Blackwell that election fraud had occurred during the 2004 United States presidential election. He speculated that SmarTech acted as a man-in-the-middle with the ability to alter vote totals.

=== 2008 United States presidential election ===
During the 2008 election, SmarTech hosted about 2 million minutes of political phone bank activity per day on its servers. The Chattanooga Times Free Press stated that the company was at one point the largest worldwide user of online phone minutes. SmarTech worked with political clients to build targeted lists based on a database of call lists using personal traits such as age, location, and political leaning. They also built mathematical models for predicting the decisions that a person would make using trend analysis.

=== First Trump administration ===
In the first few days of the first Trump administration, senior officials, including Kellyanne Conway, Jared Kushner, Sean Spicer, and Steve Bannon, had active accounts on an RNC email system, rnchq.org. This system was the same one involved in the Bush White House email controversy and was also hosted by SmarTech. According to the U.S. intelligence community, the RNC email system was hacked during the 2016 presidential campaign. The emails of Bannon, Kushner, and Conway were since deleted by the RNC.

=== Atlanta government ransomware attack ===
After the 2018 Atlanta government ransomware attack, during which hackers demanded $50,000, SmarTech billed the city of Atlanta $393,328.
