= Alliance for Representative Democracy =

American democracy education organization

- Founded: 2002
- Founders: Trust for Representative Democracy at the National Conference of State Legislatures, The Center on Congress at Indiana University, The Center for Civic Education
- Purpose: American representative democracy
- Endowment: The Alliance for Representative Democracy is funded by the U.S. Department of Education under the Education for Democracy Act approved by the U.S. Congress. ADTV is made possible by the Alliance for Representative Democracy, a partnership combining the resources of: the National Conference of State Legislatures, the Center on Congress, and the Center for Civic Education.

The Alliance for Representative Democracy is a USA based organization that is a partnership between the Trust for Representative Democracy at the National Conference of State Legislatures, the Center on Congress at Indiana University, and the Center for Civic Education. The Alliance launched the Representative Democracy in America: Voices of the People project to introduce citizens to the critical relationship between government and the people it serves. The project introduces citizens, particularly young people, to the representatives, institutions, and processes that serve to realize the goal of a government of, by, and for the people.

== Project goals ==
- Improve public understanding of the United States Congress and state legislatures.
- Strengthen classroom teaching about representative democracy.
- Develop mass media programs to inform the public about representative institutions.
- Provide legislators and staff with resource materials to help improve public understanding of their institutions.
- Support research on public views about Congress and state legislatures.

== Initiatives ==
The mission of the Alliance for Representative Democracy is to educate citizens about Congress and state legislatures through an array of programs and initiatives to foster civic learning and citizen engagement.

=== Resources for civic education ===
The Alliance for Representative Democracy provides lesson plans, interactive modules, and video series designed to build on one another are mainly for civics, American government, and history courses taught at the high school level.

=== Teacher professional development ===
In addition to providing education materials for the classroom, the Alliance for Representative Democracy also holds The Representative Democracy in America (RDA) Professional Development Leadership Initiative, a two-day seminar that instructs “master teachers” how to train elementary and secondary educators in their home states on RDA curricular materials.

The seminar includes learning about representative democracy from scholars and experts in the field, including former congressman Lee H. Hamilton, Director of the Center on Congress at Indiana University.

=== America’s Legislators Back to School Program ===
This initiative encourages state legislators to visit classrooms to teach about American democracy. More than 1,300 legislators bring their firsthand experience to nearly 300,000 students each year.

=== Survey on Congress ===
Survey on Congress is an annual national survey of the public’s attitudes about Congress and examines how people learn about and interact with Congress, how they rate its performance and how they regard their responsibilities as citizens.

=== American Democracy Television ===
American Democracy Television (ADTV) provides nonpartisan programming about representative democracy to Public, educational, and government access (PEG) cable TV channels across the United States.

Topics include:

- How representative democracy works at the local, state and national levels
- How compromise and disagreement are an important part of our system of democracy
- How the people's ideas and special interests are represented
- How the people make their voices heard

The programming currently reaches more than 12 million households on a regular basis and continues to educate the public about representative democracy, with its stated goal to challenge cynicism and reinvigorating the public's perception of its government.

=== American Civic Education Teacher Awards ===
The American Civic Education Teacher Awards recognize educators who have demonstrated a special expertise in teaching about the U.S. Constitution, the U.S. Congress, and public policy. Each year the ACETA program selects and showcases three teachers who have done exemplary work in preparing young people to become informed and engaged citizens.

== Funding ==
The Alliance for Representative Democracy is funded by the U.S. Department of Education under the Education for Democracy Act approved by the U.S. Congress. The Alliance for Representative Democracy is a partnership combining the resources of: the Trust for Representative Democracy at the National Conference of State Legislatures, the Center on Congress, and the Center for Civic Education.

== See also ==
Alliance for Democracy (USA)
