= American Democracy Television =

American Democracy Television (ADTV)
- Type: Syndicated Public-access television Program
- Country: United States
- Availability: All 50 states
- Founded: 2005 by Alliance for Representative Democracy
- Key people: National Conference of State Legislatures, Center on Congress, Center for Civic Education
- Callsign meaning: American Democracy Television
- Official website: http://www.representativedemocracy.org

American Democracy Television (ADTV) provides nonpartisan programming about representative democracy to Public, educational, and government access (PEG) cable TV channels across the United States.

== General ==
ADTV programming is produced by The Alliance for Representative Democracy a partnership combining the resources of the National Conference of State Legislatures, Trust for Representative Democracy; the Center for Civic Education and the Center on Congress at Indiana University. The project is funded by the U.S. Department of Education under the Education for Democracy Act approved by the U.S. Congress. ADTV has free programming available to public-access television, educational-access television, government-access television channels nationwide, and currently distributes to nearly 500 cable TV stations.

=== Selected topics ===
- How representative democracy works at the local, state and national levels
- That compromise and disagreement are an important part of our system of democracy
- How their ideas and special interests are represented
- Ways to make their voices heard

In its first 2 years, ADTV spread to all 50 states and Washington, DC. The programming currently reaches over 12 million households on a regular basis and continues to educate the public about representative democracy, with its stated goal to challenge cynicism and reinvigorating the public's perception of its government.

== Awards ==
ADTV Flight 4 won the 2005 Gold Marcom Award.
