= Cliff Arnebeck =

American lawyer

Clifford O. "Cliff" Arnebeck, Jr. (born 15 January 1945 in Washington, D.C., USA; died 28 December 2022 in Northport, Michigan) was a national co-chair and attorney for the Alliance for Democracy.

== Early life and education ==
The son of an officer in the Bureau of Finance, Post Office Department, he graduated B.A. Wesleyan University in 1967 and received a J.D. from Harvard Law School in 1970.

== Career ==
Arnebeck first worked for Ohio Bell in Cleveland, Ohio and later in the legal department for the American Electric Power Company before joining the Jones, Day law firm in Columbus, Ohio.

He opened a private practice in Columbus. In 1990, he unsuccessfully contested the Republican Party primary election in Ohio's 15th congressional district against 12-term congressman Chalmers Wylie.

Arnebeck was a leader in the Ohio campaign for Ross Perot's failed 1992 presidential campaign. Questioning the micromanagement of the campaign by Perot's staff in Houston, Arnebeck eventually challenged its legitimacy in a Washington press conference before the election. In 1996 Arnebeck ran for Congress as a Democrat against Wylie's successor, Republican Congresswoman Deborah Pryce. and once again lost by a large margin. Disturbed at what he perceived as the behind the scenes manipulation of the political system, he filed a suit and successfully challenged the Ohio Chamber of Commerce's financing of the campaign in 2000 to defeat Justice Alice Robie Resnick, a Democrat.

Arnebeck then sought to act as a legal watchdog during elections. The handling of the 2004 presidential election by the state administration prompted him to represent groups challenging the legitimacy of the state's vote count in a lawsuit, known as "Moss v. Bush", which was eventually dismissed by the court at the plaintiffs' request following the acceptance of Ohio's electoral votes by the U.S. House and Senate on 6 January 2005. However, some believe that scrutiny brought by the lawsuit led to the abandonment of what they claimed was ongoing voting machine fraud. The Ohio Secretary of State filed a motion for sanction against the plaintiffs, alleging that the claim in Moss v. Bush was meritless, did not meet the standards of evidence required by law, and was brought only for partisan political purposes. The court held that Arnebeck's allegations in the contest of the presidential election were "at best, highly improbable and potentially defamatory, inflammatory, and devoid of logic," but declined to impose sanctions on Arnebeck.

Since then, Arnebeck has focused on what he claims is the fraudulent use of electronic voting machines in elections, a main issue in the 2004 suit, as the major threat to American elections. When the former George W. Bush campaign operative Michael Connell died in a 2008 light aircraft crash in Ohio after being deposed by Arnebeck in his on-going suits on the 2004 election, Arnebeck felt that Karl Rove and others in the Bush 2004 campaign might be linked to the crash. On 26 July 2016, Arnebeck posted an open letter to President Barack Obama and Vice President Joe Biden claiming that Rove helped Hillary Clinton win the 2016 Democratic Party presidential primaries through voting machine hacks, assassinations, and other election fraud tactics. As of 4 August 2016, Arnebeck believes his current witnesses are at risk since he believes that at least two of his past witnesses, former state legislative candidate Beverly Campbell and Congresswoman Stephanie Tubbs Jones, were assassinated. In an interview, Arnebeck stated:

I don’t have to prove [the assassinations], what I have to prove is the election stealing, which I can do. The reason it’s important to make people aware of the assassinations is that that is the cover-up. Another one of my witnesses, there was another attempt on her life. Now if I lose all my inside witnesses then I can’t prove my election case. And they know that, I know that, and one of the ways to protect my ability to prove the election stealing is to make the public aware of the assassination business so that perhaps there will be some protection. Having the FBI director as corrupt, he might as well be viewed as the conciliary of the global criminal cabal that’s behind all this stuff. So here’s the guy who’s supposed to be investigating the crime and he’s part of the crime, he’s an actor in the crime, he has a real conflict of interest. And the attorney general has a real conflict of interest, and the President has a gun to his head in effect. So, I don’t know what to say, you talk about assassinations you get labeled a conspiracy theorist, but if I don’t talk about assassinations then they just keep doing it, keep getting away with it, and the cover-up goes on. That is the key to the cover-up: no potential witnesses where they could testify.

== Media appearances ==
- American Dream Radio: Cliff Arnebeck, lead counsel for the voters' lawsuit in Ohio which seeks to reverse the election outcome because of widespread voting irregularities. He explains about the lawsuit (as opposed to the recount), discusses some of the voter suppression tactics used, and talks about the expected course of the legal wrangling. 19 Dec. 2004 at 9:25 a.m.(audio)
- Pacifica Radio: Cliff Arnebeck claims how the Ohio vote was rigged (audio)
- C-SPAN video: Cliff Arnebeck, National Co-Chairman for the Alliance for Democracy and counsel in a lawsuit challenging the presidential election in Ohio, discusses the legal challenges to the 2004 vote in Ohio. 12/2/2004: WASHINGTON, DC: 30 min. (video, rm)

== See also ==
- 2004 United States election voting controversies
- Moss v. Bush
