= Mark Crispin Miller =

American professor and conspiracy theorist

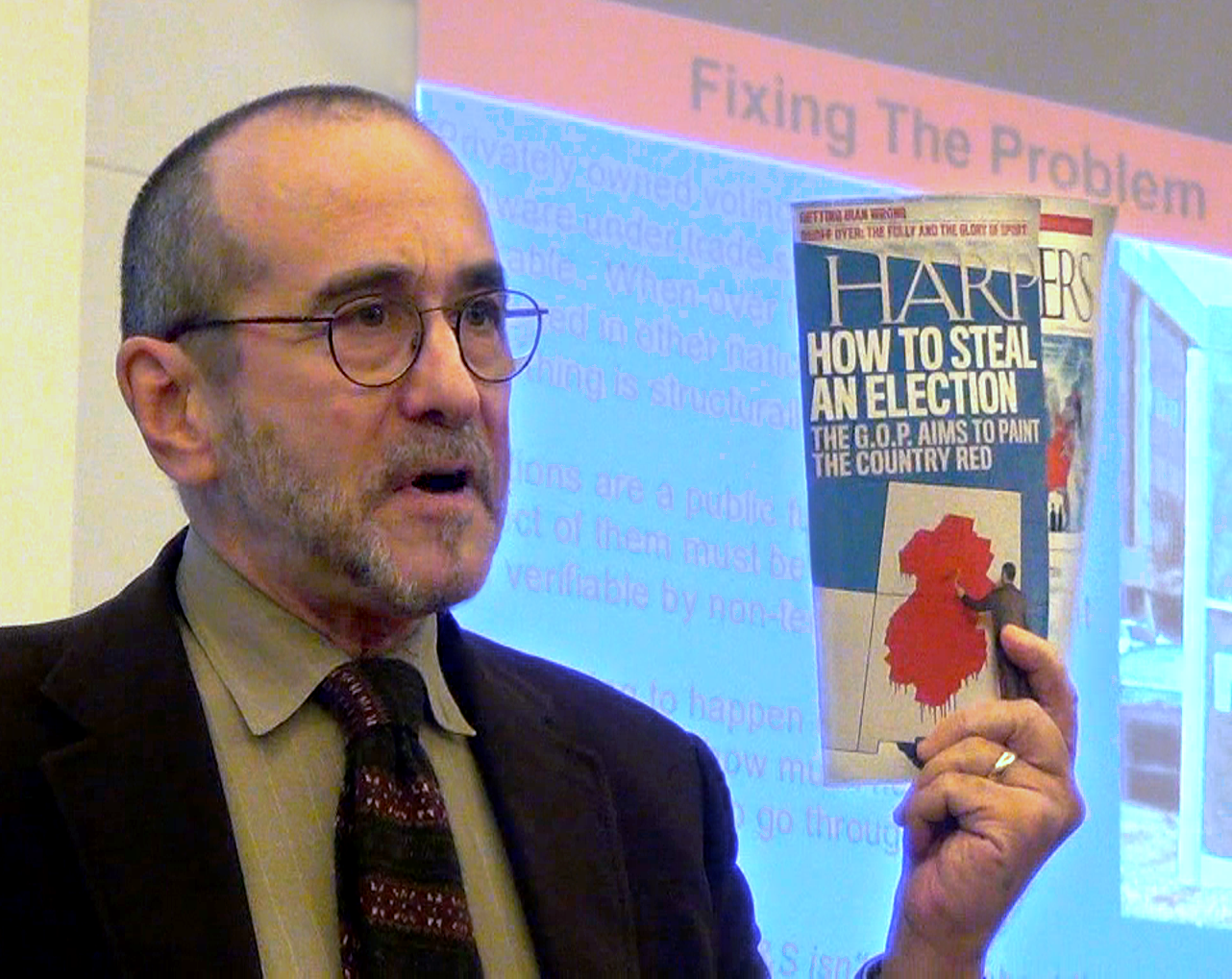
- Miller speaking at New York City's Open Center in 2012
- Born: 6 November 1949 (age 77); Chicago, Illinois, U.S.
- Occupation: Professor

Academic background
- Education: Northwestern University (BA); Johns Hopkins University (MA, PhD)

Academic work
- Discipline: Media studies
- Institutions: New York University (NYU)
- Website: markcrispinmiller.com

Mark Crispin Miller (born 6 November 1949) is an American media scholar and a professor of media studies at New York University. He has promoted conspiracy theories about U.S. presidential elections, the September 11 attacks and the Sandy Hook Elementary School shooting as well as misinformation about COVID-19 and vaccines.

== Background and career ==
Miller has a doctorate in English from Johns Hopkins University.

In the introduction to Seeing Through Movies, Miller writes that advertising has affected the nature of U.S. films. He has said that the multinational corporations in control of the U.S. media have changed youth culture's focus away from values and toward commercial interests and personal vanity.

In a June 2001 profile by Chris Hedges for The New York Times, Miller called himself a "public intellectual" and criticized television news "that is astonishingly empty and distorts reality". In December 2020 he appeared on the Useful Idiots podcast and was praised by its host, Matt Taibbi.

== Promotion of conspiracy theories and disinformation ==
In his social and political commentary, Miller frequently espouses conspiracy theories.

On social media and in other statements, Miller has promoted conspiracy theories about the September 11 attacks; Miller is a signatory to the 9/11 Truth Statement and a member of the 9/11 Truth movement. He dislikes the term "conspiracy theory", calling the phrase a "meme" used to "discredit people engaged in really necessary kinds of investigation and inquiry." In a 2017 New York Observer interview, he said anyone using the term "in a pejorative sense" is "a witting or unwitting CIA asset".

In 2017, Miller told a session at the Left Forum that Syrian President Bashar al-Assad had not dropped barrel bombs on his own people, that the allegation of a crematorium at Sednaya Prison was a hoax, and that the chemical attacks on Sunni areas were actually staged by the victims (with help from Turkey in the main 2013 case) to draw the U.S. into the war.

=== Election fraud conspiracy theories ===
In his book Fooled Again, Miller claims that the 2000 and 2004 U.S. presidential elections were stolen. He has since claimed that the 2020 U.S. Presidential election was stolen.

In a 2024 Substack post, Miller gave a detailed statement about the U.S. presidential elections he believes were stolen. He claimed that the 2000 election was rigged in favor of George W. Bush over Al Gore to allow the war on terror, that the 2004 election was again rigged for Bush to ensure victory over John Kerry, that the 2016 election was rigged to allow Donald Trump to defeat Hillary Clinton but that Trump was legitimately reelected in 2020 (or just "elected", as Miller claims his first term in office was actually an "ascension" due its illegitimacy) and despite that was stolen to force him out of office and replace him with Joe Biden.

Miller also claimed that these elections were rigged by the CIA, the media, and both the Democratic and Republican parties (but for the last two, only against the other party). He claimed that each party routinely steals elections from the other and that to say only one party steals elections is partisan. Miller also denounced the term "election denier" and its use by the media to describe himself and other people who claim the 2020 election was stolen, saying the term is used to compare them "morally and intellectually" to "Holocaust deniers", people who propagate the racist and disproved view that the Holocaust is a hoax.

=== 9/11 hoax conspiracy theory ===
In 2016, Miller gave a speech to the Architects & Engineers for 9/11 Truth. After a "truthers" symposium on 9/11, Miller told Vice that the official explanations for 9/11 and John F. Kennedy's assassination "are just as unscientific as the ones that everybody feels comfortable ridiculing".

=== Sandy Hook Elementary School massacre hoax conspiracy theory ===
In a blog post, Miller suggested that the Sandy Hook Elementary School massacre was a hoax; in a subsequent interview, he denied that any children died in the shooting and voiced "suspicion" that "it was staged" or was "some kind of an exercise". Miller praised a Sandy Hook denial book by James Fetzer as "compelling" (a $450,000 defamation judgment had previously been entered against Fetzer, after the father of one of the murdered Sandy Hook students sued him for false statements made in the book).

=== Anti-vaccination and COVID misinformation ===
Miller has also screened for his students the anti-vaccination film Vaxxed, produced by disgraced former physician Andrew Wakefield (who was struck off the medical register in the UK for scientific misconduct). Miller has spread COVID-19 misinformation, including misleading claims about the efficacy of face masks and false claims that COVID-19 vaccines alter recipients' DNA, and believes the virus may have been an artificially created bioweapon.

== Books ==
Miller's books include:

- Miller, Mark Crispin (1988). Boxed in: the Culture of TV. Evanston, IL: Northwestern University Press. ISBN 0-8101-0791-0. OCLC 18017073.
- Seeing Through Movies (edited, 1990), Pantheon Books.
- The Bush Dyslexicon: Observations on a National Disorder (2001)
- Cruel and Unusual: Bush/Cheney's New World Order (2004), W.W. Norton & Company, ISBN 0-393-05917-0.
- Fooled Again: How the Right Stole the 2004 Election and Why They'll Steal the Next One Too (Unless We Stop Them) (2005), New York: Basic Books ISBN 0-465-04579-0.
- Loser Take All : Election Fraud and the Subversion of Democracy, 2000-2008 (IG Publishing), December 2008, ISBN 978-0978843144)

== See also ==
- 2004 United States election voting controversies
