= Voter News Service =

Exit polling consortium

The Voter News Service was an exit polling consortium formed in 1990 by six major U.S. news media organizations, until its disbandment in 2003. Its mission was to provide results for United States presidential elections, so that individual organizations and networks would not have to do exit polling and vote tallying in parallel.

== Members ==
The VNS included major United States television networks and newspapers:

- ABC News
- CBS News
- NBC News
- CNN
- Fox News
- The Associated Press

ABC News scooped its partners all night in reporting outcomes of the 1994 US elections when it hired an outside firm to do exit polling and was able to make earlier calls with that data.

== Role in the 2000 presidential election ==
=== Election night in Florida ===
The VNS received intense criticism for its 'flip-flop' calling of the state of Florida in that election. During the course of the evening, it first called the closely contested state of Florida for Al Gore, then to George W. Bush, and then as 'too close to call'. Critics argued that the state should never have been called until the state's fate was clear. The service also received criticism for calling Florida for Gore before the polls closed in the Florida panhandle, which was located in the Central Time Zone and heavily Republican, and for calling the state to Bush before precincts in Broward, Palm Beach, Volusia, and Miami-Dade Counties reported their results to the state.

=== Bush v. Gore ===
The next day it was discovered that 'bad data' resulted in the confusion of the previous night. Due to the Bush margin of victory being less than 0.5% of the total number of votes cast, an automatic statewide machine recount was ordered. In Palm Beach County, a butterfly ballot was used to conduct the election in some precincts. On election day, voters intending to vote for Al Gore instead voted for Pat Buchanan, and the Reform Party ticket. Buchanan received 3,407 votes or 0.8% of the total compared to 0.29% of the total statewide. As a result, unwilling Buchanan voters in Palm Beach county reported votes for Gore in exit polling which resulted in flawed data.

== 2002 polling attempt and subsequent disbandment ==
In 2002, the VNS intended to make calls in the November 2002 U.S. Congressional and Senate elections. It attempted to use a computer system designed for VNS by Battelle Memorial Institute to do this. A system failure occurred in this computer on election night, making quick delivery of data impossible. In fact, collecting and delivering the data took ten months to complete.

In January 2003, the Voter News Service was disbanded largely because of failures in 2000 and 2002. Murray Edelman, VNS editorial director, criticized the decision as making the VNS a scapegoat.

== National Election Pool ==
In the 2004 presidential election, the news organizations that had comprised the membership of the Voter News Service set up a new organization named the National Election Pool, utilizing consultants Edison/Mitofsky for exit polling and the Associated Press for official returns. However, the NEP had controversies of its own for 2004 when it released exit polling data early that was significantly different from the final results.
