= Triad GSI =

Triad GSI (also known as Triad Governmental Systems Inc.) is an American voting machine vendor based in Xenia, Ohio. Their main products are election-related computer hardware and software for counting ballots, as well as voter registration.

== Coverage ==
As of 2000, eight counties in Florida, 48 counties in Ohio, 15 counties in Tennessee, and three counties in South Carolina used Triad equipment.

== Leadership ==
Tod Rapp was president in 1992, while Dwayne Rapp was vice president as of 2000. Brett Rapp was president since at least 2000 and is still president as of 2016. He is the founder of Triad and "a consistent contributor to Republican causes."

== Activities ==
=== 1988 Citrus County, Florida primary election ===
During the 1992 Democratic primary for Supervisor of Elections in Citrus County, Florida, candidate and former employee Lisa Beville accused her former supervisor Wilma Anderson (the incumbent) of not following proper procedures. Beville stated that before the 1988 primary election, she saw Triad employees adjusting software to "clear up a ballot-counting problem", but that the voting machines were not re-certified and that other officials were not told about the changes. Beville said she shared her concerns with Anderson, who told her "to mind [her] own business". Beville also expressed concern about ballot security in the office. Anderson denied all allegations, saying that a lightning strike caused the issues that the Triad employees were fixing. Triad president Tod Rapp supported Anderson's retelling of events, while Beville said that weather was not involved and was still concerned about a lack of transparency.

Beville resigned in 1990, with Beville and Anderson signed a non-disclosure agreement forbidding either of them from discussing why Beville had left. Beville ultimately lost the 1992 primary.

=== 2000 United States presidential election ===
Dwayne Rapp believed that the hanging chads in the 2000 United States presidential election recount in Florida should not be counted, arguing that it was impossible to know why a voter had made a given mark. Rapp said that Broward, Palm Beach and Dade counties did not use Triad equipment.

Psephos Corp., also based in Xenia, Ohio and led by Tod Rapp, had developed the voting machines that produced the butterfly ballots.

=== 2004 United States presidential election ===
On December 13, 2004, Sherole Eaton, the deputy director of elections for Hocking County, Ohio submitted an affidavit which stated that Michael Barbian Jr., a Triad employee, disassembled and then "put a patch" on the tabulation machine a few days before the Ohio recount. Douglas W. Jones characterized the visit as a security breach and a possible violation of Ohio election law. Brett Rapp claimed that Barbian visited to modify the computer before the recount so that it would only count the presidential votes; that the computer had "a CMOS error"; and that Eaton likely misheard the word "patch". Eaton disputed that she heard Barbian incorrectly, but did not believe that Triad had tampered with the votes. She said in 2005 that visit still seemed suspicious. Brett Rapp also denied that any tampering had occurred.

In an investigation led by John Conyers, the House Judiciary Committee released a report in January 2005 detailing Triad's intervention in two more counties in Ohio. Triad replaced the hard drive on a tabulator in Union County, Ohio after the election, and had also replaced the machine in Monroe County, Ohio after it mismatched a hand count. According to the report, Triad employees appeared to share "cheat sheets" with people who were counting ballots so as to prevent county-wide recounts from occurring.

Conyers wrote to Triad in December 2004 asking them to confirm that they did not have remote access to their voting machines.
