= 2000 United States presidential election recount in Florida =

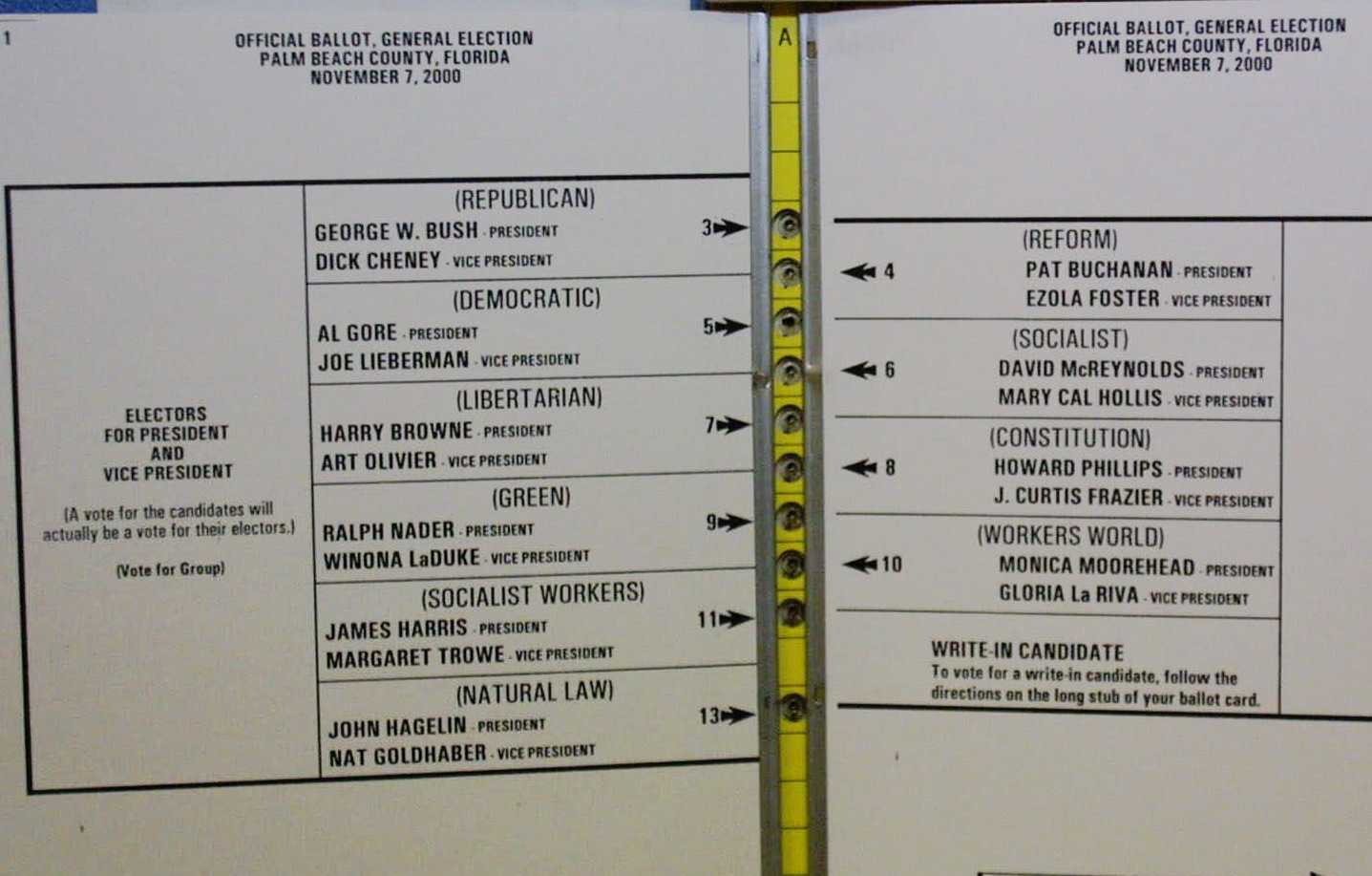
The "butterfly ballot" used in Palm Beach County, Florida, was suspected of causing Al Gore's supporters to accidentally vote for Pat Buchanan.

The 2000 United States presidential election recount in Florida was a period of vote recounting in Florida that occurred during the weeks after Election Day in the 2000 United States presidential election between George W. Bush and Al Gore. The Florida vote was ultimately settled in Bush's favor by a margin of 537 votes out of 5,963,110 cast when the U.S. Supreme Court, in Bush v. Gore, stopped a recount that had been initiated upon a ruling by the Florida Supreme Court. Bush's win in Florida gave him a majority of votes in the Electoral College and victory in the presidential election.

== Background ==
The controversy began on election night, November 7, 2000, when the national television networks, using information provided to them by the Voter News Service, an organization formed by the Associated Press to help determine the outcome of the election through early result tallies and exit polling, first called Florida for Gore in the hour after polls closed in the peninsula (in the Eastern time zone) but about ten minutes before they closed in the heavily Republican counties of the panhandle (in the Central time zone). Later in the evening, the networks reversed their call, moving to "too close to call", then later giving it to Bush; then they retracted that call as well, finally indicating the state was "too close to call". Gore phoned Bush the night of the election to concede, then retracted his concession after learning how close the Florida count was.

Bush led the election-night vote count in Florida by 1,784 votes. The small margin produced an automatic recount under Florida state law, which began the day after the election. That first day's results reduced the margin to just over 900 votes.

== Recount ==
=== Mandatory statewide machine recount ===
The Florida election was closely scrutinized after Election Day. Because the margin of the original vote count was less than 0.5 percent, Florida Election Code 102.141 mandated a statewide machine recount, which began the day after the election. It was ostensibly completed on November 10 in the 66 Florida counties that used vote-counting machines and reduced Bush's lead to 327 votes. According to legal analyst Jeffrey Toobin, later analysis showed that a total of 18 counties—accounting for a quarter of all votes cast in Florida—did not carry out the legally mandated machine recount, but "No one from the Gore campaign ever challenged this view" that the machine recount had been completed.

=== Manual recount in select counties ===
Once the closeness of the election in Florida was clear, both the Bush and Gore campaigns organized themselves for the ensuing legal process. On November 9, the Bush campaign announced they had hired George H. W. Bush's former Secretary of State James Baker and Republican political consultant Roger Stone to oversee their legal team, and the Gore campaign hired Bill Clinton's former Secretary of State Warren Christopher.

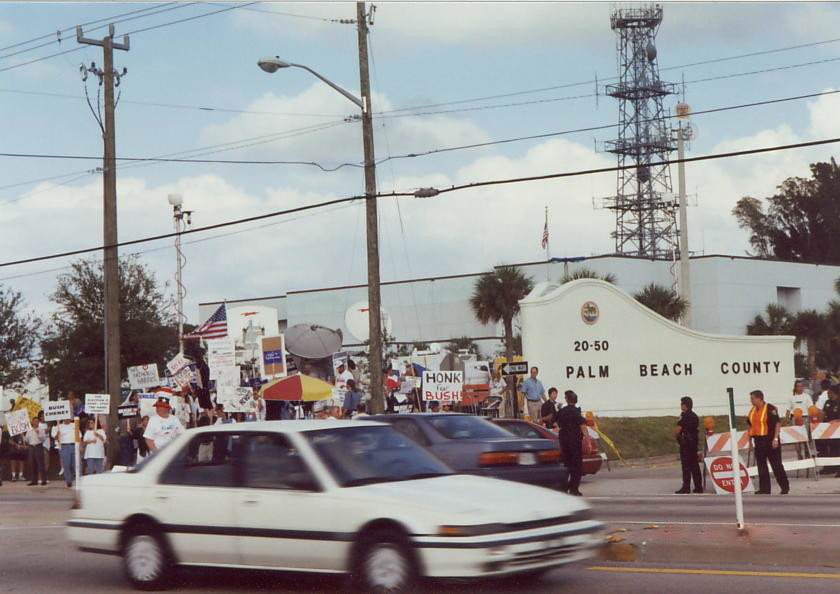
The Palm Beach County recount attracted protestors and media.

Following the machine recount, the Gore campaign requested a manual recount in four counties. Florida state law at the time allowed a candidate to request a manual recount by protesting the results of at least three precincts. The county canvassing board was then to decide whether to do a recount, as well as the method of the recount, in those three precincts. If the board discovered an error that in its judgment could affect the outcome of the election, they were then authorized to do a full recount of the ballots. This statutory process primarily accommodated recounts for local elections. The Gore campaign requested that disputed ballots in Miami-Dade, Broward, Palm Beach, and Volusia Counties be counted by hand. Volusia County started its recount on November 12. Florida statutes also required that all counties certify and report their returns, including any recounts, by 5:00 p.m. on November 14. The manual recounts were time-consuming, and it soon became clear that some counties would not complete their recounts before the deadline. On November 13, the Gore campaign and Volusia and Palm Beach Counties sued to have the deadlines extended.

Meanwhile, the Bush campaign worked to stop the recount. On November 11, it joined a group of Florida voters in suing in federal district court for a preemptive injunction to stop all manual recounting of votes in Florida. Bush's lawyers argued that recounting votes in just four counties violated the 14th Amendment and also that similarly punched ballots could be tabulated differently since Florida had no detailed statutory standards for hand-counting votes. On November 13, the federal court ruled against an injunction.

=== Reporting deadline ===
On November 14, the original deadline for reporting results, with the Volusia County recount complete, Bush held a 300-vote lead. The same day, a state judge upheld that deadline but ruled that further recounts could be considered later. Florida's Secretary of State, Katherine Harris, a Republican, then gave counties until 2:00 p.m. on November 15 to provide reasons for recounting their ballots.

=== Manual recount continues ===
The next day, the Florida Supreme Court allowed manual recounts in Palm Beach and Broward Counties to continue but left it to a state judge to decide whether Harris must include those votes in the final tally. Miami-Dade County decided on November 17 to conduct a recount but suspended it on November 22. The Gore campaign sued to force Miami-Dade County to continue its recount, but the Florida Supreme Court refused to consider the request.

As the manual recounts continued, the battle to certify the results intensified. On November 17, Judge Terry Lewis of Leon County Circuit Court permitted Harris to certify the election results without the manual recounts, but on the same day, the Florida Supreme Court stayed that decision until it could consider an appeal by Gore. On November 21, the Florida Supreme Court ruled unanimously that manual counts in Broward, Palm Beach, and Miami-Dade Counties must be included and set 5:00 p.m. on November 26 as the earliest time for certification. After that decision, the Bush campaign appealed to the U.S. Supreme Court, arguing that the state court effectively rewrote state election statutes after the vote.

=== Overseas absentee ballots ===
As the manual recounts progressed, most of Florida's counties were considering overseas absentee ballots. That part of the vote count was completed on November 18, increasing Bush's lead to 930 votes. Because recounts later showed that Gore had actually won the election day vote, it was the margin in overseas absentee ballots that won Bush the election. After the election, a New York Times six month long investigation showed that 680 of the overseas absentee ballots were illegally counted. It further claimed that this was due to "blatantly illegal actions on the part of local election officials, encouraged by Republicans." A 2004 analysis of those votes by Kosuke Imai and Gary King determined that if the bad ballots had been litigated (which they were not) and disqualified, Gore would have cut the margin, but probably not by enough to win without winning other votes elsewhere.

=== Certification and recount continuation ===
The Palm Beach County recount and the Miami-Dade County recount (having been suspended) were still incomplete at 5:00 p.m. on November 26, when Harris certified the statewide vote count with Bush ahead by 537 votes. The next day, Gore sued under Florida's statutory construct of the "contest phase". On November 28, Judge N. Sanders Sauls of Leon County Circuit Court rejected Gore's request to include the recount results from Miami-Dade and Palm Beach Counties. Gore appealed that decision to the Florida Supreme Court.

=== U.S. Supreme Court involvement ===
The U.S. Supreme Court convened on December 1 to consider Bush's appeal of the Florida Supreme Court's November 21 decision extending the certification date.

On December 4, Sauls rejected Gore's contest of the election result; Gore appealed. Also on December 4, the U.S. Supreme Court ordered the Florida Supreme Court to clarify its ruling that had extended the certification date.

On December 6, the Republican-controlled Florida legislature convened a special session to appoint a slate of electors pledged to Bush, based on the fact that the U.S. Constitution gives state legislatures the authority to determine how their electors are appointed. Some have argued that awarding the electors in this manner would be illegal.

On December 8, the Florida justices, by a 4–3 vote, rejected the selective use of manual recounts in just four counties and ordered immediate manual recounts of all ballots in the state where no vote for president had been machine-recorded, also known as undervotes.

=== Recount ended ===
The electoral college during the certification of the 2000 election in Florida

On December 9, the U.S. Supreme Court suspended the manual recount, in progress for only several hours, on the grounds that irreparable harm could befall Bush, according to a concurring opinion by Justice Antonin Scalia.

On December 12, the U.S. Supreme Court ordered in Bush v. Gore that the recount must stop because it lacked a uniform statewide methodology and there was insufficient time to create one and complete the recount. The same day, the Florida House approved awarding the state's electoral votes to Bush, but the matter was moot after the Court's ruling.

=== Gore concedes ===
On December 13, Gore conceded the election to Bush in a nationally televised address.

== Lingering controversies ==
During the recount, controversy ensued with the discovery of various irregularities that had occurred in the voting process in several counties. Among these was the Palm Beach "butterfly ballot", which resulted in an unusually high number of votes for Reform Party candidate Pat Buchanan. Conservatives claimed that the same ballot had been successfully used in the 1996 election; in fact, it had never been used in a Palm Beach County election among rival candidates for office, but only for referendums. Also, before the election, the Secretary of State's office ordered county election officials to expunge tens of thousands of citizens identified as felons from the Florida voting rolls, using a list that later demonstrated error levels of 15% or greater. Black people were identified on some counties' lists at up to five times their share of the population. A December 4 article exposing flaws in the process correctly claimed that many of these were not felons and should have been eligible to vote under Florida law. The demographics of the list strongly suggested that, of those who were wrongly on the list and thus should have been able to vote, an overwhelming number of Black people would have chosen the Democratic nominee.

Additionally, this Florida election produced many more "overvotes" than usual, especially in predominantly African-American precincts in Duval County (Jacksonville), where some 21,000 ballots had multiple markings, such as two or more choices for president. Unlike the much-discussed Palm Beach County butterfly ballot, the Duval County ballot spread choices for president over two non-facing pages. At the same time that the Bush campaign was contesting hand recounts in Democratic counties, it accepted hand recounts in Republican counties that gained it 185 votes, including where Republican Party workers had been permitted to correct errors on thousands of applications for Republicans' absentee ballots.

Political commentator and author Jeff Greenfield observed that the Republican operatives in Florida talked and acted like combat platoon sergeants in what one called "switchblade time", the biggest political fight of the century. On the other hand, he said, Democrats talked like referees with a fear of pushing too hard, not wanting to be seen as sore losers.

While Democrats did make their way down to Florida, there was nothing like the certainty or the passion that ignited Republicans. The only exception: African-Americans. For all the furor over Palm Beach, it was black precincts where voters had been turned away, denied a ballot because some had been mislabeled as felons, blocked from voting because of bureaucratic bungles, or because the huge increase in black turnout had overwhelmed local officials. For those with memories going back four decades, all this was no accident. It was instead a painful reminder of the days when the battle for the ballot was, literally, a life-and-death matter. At an NAACP-sponsored hearing in Miami four days after the election, prospective voters told of police cars blocking the way to the polls, of voters harassed by election workers. It was anecdotal evidence at best, and local authorities argued persuasively that the police presence near a polling place was pure coincidence. Such explanations did little to lessen the sense of anger among black Democrats.

=== Controversial issues ===
Various flaws and improprieties in Florida's electoral processes were immediately apparent, while others were reported after later investigation. Controversies included:

- All five major U.S. TV news networks (CBS, NBC, ABC, Fox and CNN) assumed that they could confidently call a winner in any state "where the vast majority of polls had closed", based on history. No call in a state with two different poll-closing times had ever turned out wrong. While most of Florida is in the Eastern time zone, polls in the westernmost counties in Florida were open for another hour, until 8:00 p.m. EST, as they are in the Central time zone. The network calls were made about ten minutes before the polls in the Central time zone closed, based on the Voter News Service calling the state of Florida for Gore at 7:48 p.m. EST. This region of the state traditionally voted mostly Republican. A survey estimate by John McLaughlin & Associates put the number of voters who might not have voted due to the networks' call as high as 15,000, which could have reduced Bush's margin of victory by an estimated 5,000 votes; a study by conservative researcher John Lott found that Bush's margin of victory was reduced by 7,500 votes. This survey assumed that the turnout in the Panhandle counties, which was 65%, would have equaled the statewide average of 68% if the state had not been called for Gore while the polls were still open. But the relatively smaller turnout percentage in the Panhandle has been attributed to the surge in the Black vote elsewhere in Florida to 16% of the total, from 10% of the total in 1996. Research conducted by Henry Brady and David Collier strongly disputed Lott and McLaughlin's findings. Brady and Collier were sharply critical of Lott's methodology and claimed when all relevant factors are accounted for, Bush was likely cost only between 28 and 56 votes. In a 2010 television special by the TV Guide Network, the "2000 Election Flip Flop Coverage" ranked #3 on a list of the 25 biggest TV blunders, having caused news outlets to change the way they report on election night.

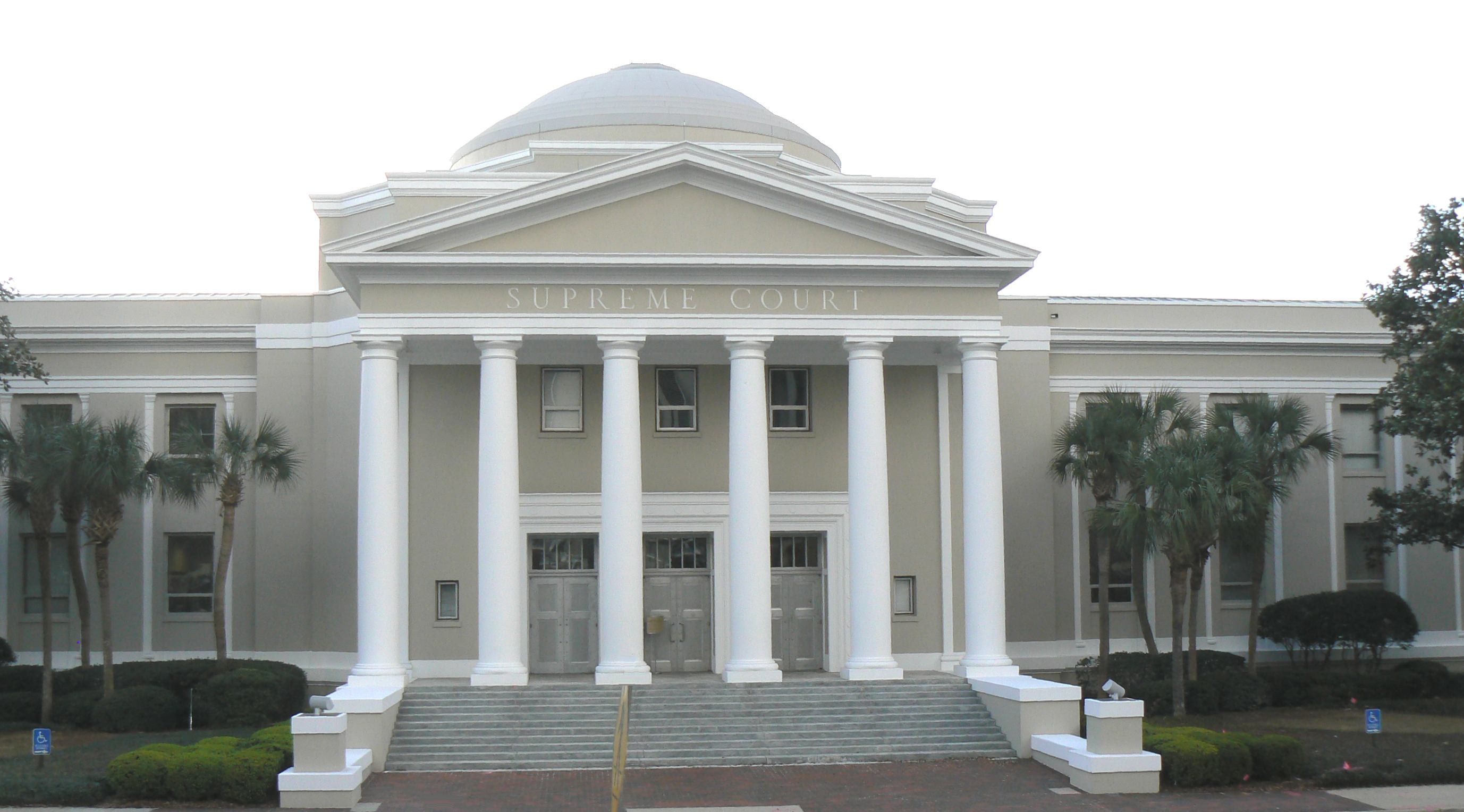
Supreme Court of Florida

- Democratic State Senator Daryl Jones said that there had to have been an order to set up roadblocks in heavily Democratic regions of the state on the day of the election. The Voting Section of the U. S. Department of Justice later investigated reports from the Tallahassee and Tampa areas and concluded that there was no evidence that roadblocks were related to the election or had occurred in close proximity to voting places.
- On November 8, Florida Division of Elections staff prepared a press release for Secretary of State Katherine Harris that said overseas ballots must be "postmarked or signed and dated" by Election Day. It was never released. Harris did send out a letter saying that absentee ballots without postmarks must be discarded, but Florida's attorney general subsequently said they should not be. On November 13, Harris issued her first statement on overseas ballots, saying that they had to be "executed" on or before Election Day, not "postmarked on or prior to" Election Day. Over Thanksgiving, 14 county boards decided to include 288 overseas ballots that had been rejected days earlier, an act dubbed the "Thanksgiving stuffing".
- On November 14, Democratic lawyer Mark Herron authored a memo on how to challenge flawed ballots, including overseas ballots cast by members of the military. It gave postmark and "point of origin" criteria that Herron maintained could be used to challenge overseas ballots. It was in line with a letter Harris sent stating that if an overseas ballot had no postmark, it had to be thrown out. Meanwhile, Republicans relied on their own 52-page manual for the same purpose. But on November 19, Democratic vice-presidential candidate Senator Joseph I. Lieberman appeared on Meet the Press and said that election officials should give the "benefit of the doubt" to military voters rather than disqualifying any overseas ballots that lacked required postmarks or witness signatures. Florida Attorney General Bob Butterworth, a Gore supporter, later told the counties to reconsider ballots without a postmark. Before that, the Democrats had pursued a strategy of persuading counties to strictly enforce postmark requirements by disqualifying illegal ballots from overseas, which were predominantly for Bush. In contrast, Republicans pursued a strategy of disqualifying overseas ballots in counties that favored Gore and pressuring elections officials to include flawed overseas ballots in Bush counties.

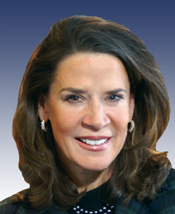
Florida Secretary of State Katherine Harris became a controversial figure during the Florida electoral recount.

- A suit by the National Association for the Advancement of Colored People (NAACP v. Harris) argued that Florida was in violation of the Voting Rights Act of 1965 and the Equal Protection Clause of the Fourteenth Amendment to the United States Constitution. A settlement agreement was reached in this suit with ChoicePoint, the owner of DBT Online, a contractor involved in preparing Florida's voter roll purge list.
- Four counties distributed sample ballots to voters that differed from the actual ballot used on election day, including Duval County, which used a caterpillar ballot, so called because the list of presidential candidates stretched over two pages. The instructions on the sample ballots said "Vote every page". More than 20% of ballots in Black precincts of Duval County were rejected because of votes for president on each page. Further, counties and precincts with large Black populations disproportionately had technologies where ballots would predictably go uncounted. In punch-card counties, 1 in 25 ballots had uncountable presidential votes, while counties that used paper ballots scanned by computers at voting places (to give voters a chance to correct their ballot if it had an error) had just 1 in 200 uncountable ballots. A systematic investigation by the United States Commission on Civil Rights concluded that although Black people made up 11% of Florida's voting population, they cast 54% of the uncounted ballots.
- Between May 1999 and Election Day 2000, two Florida secretaries of state, Sandra Mortham and Katherine Harris, contracted with DBT Online Inc., at a cost of $4.294 million, to have the "scrub lists" reworked. In a May 2000 list, over 57,000 voters were identified as felons, and counties were ordered to remove all listed names from their voting rolls. Democrats claimed that many simply had names similar to actual felons, some listed "felonies" were dated years in the future, and some were random. Some counties refused to use the list, finding it error-ridden. In other counties, supervisors of elections notified those at risk of being scrubbed, giving them a chance to prove they were not felons, which a small number did. In most cases, those on the scrub list were not told that they were not allowed to vote until they were turned away at the polls. An estimated 15% of the names on the county lists were in error. Florida was the only state in the nation to contract the first stage of removal of voting rights to a private company and did so with directions not to use cross-checks or the company's sophisticated verification plan.
- Florida Secretary of State Katherine Harris was ultimately responsible for oversight of the state's elections and certification of the results, even though she had served as a co-chair of the Bush campaign in Florida. Furthermore, George W. Bush's brother Jeb Bush was serving his first of two terms as the governor of Florida at the time. Although Jeb Bush recused himself from involvement in the recount, Democrats alleged there was still an appearance of possible impropriety.
- Some observers, such as Washington County Elections Chief Carol Griffen, have argued that Florida violated the National Voter Registration Act of 1993 by requiring those convicted of felonies in other states (and who had their rights restored by said states) to request clemency and a restoration of their rights from the governor, a process that could take two years and ultimately was left to the governor's discretion. In 1998, Schlenther v. Florida Department of State held that Florida could not prevent a man convicted of a felony in Connecticut, where his civil rights had not been lost, from exercising his right to vote.
- The Brooks Brothers riot: A raucous demonstration by several dozen paid activists, mostly Republican House aides from Washington, flown in at Republican Party expense to protest Miami-Dade County's manual recount. The recount was shut down a couple hours after the screaming protesters arrived at the county offices, where they began pounding on the doors, chanting and threatening to bring in a thousand Republicans from the Cuban-American community. Some Republicans contend that their demonstration was peaceful and was in response to the Miami-Dade election board's decision to move the ballot counting to a smaller room closer to the ballot-scanning machines to speed up the process. The election board consisted of three appointees, Myriam Lehr and David Leahy, who were Independents, and Lawrence King, a Democrat. After the demonstration, which took place in view of multiple national network television cameras, the election board reversed its decision to recount ballots, determining that it could not do so by the court-issued deadline. The Republican representatives involved in the recount effort claim this demonstration, dubbed the "Brooks Brothers Riot" because of the suits and Hermès ties the Republican operatives wore, was a key factor in "preventing the stealing of the 2000 presidential election".
- The suppression of vote pairing. Several websites sprang up to match Nader supporters in swing states like Florida with Gore supporters in non-swing states like Texas. For example, Nader supporters in Florida would vote for Gore, and Gore supporters in Texas would vote for Nader. This was intended to allow Nader to get his fair share of the vote, perhaps meeting the threshold to allow the Green Party to participate in the presidential debates in the 2004 election, while helping Gore carry swing states. Six Republican state secretaries of state, led by Bill Jones of California, threatened the websites with criminal prosecution and caused some of them to shut down. The ACLU became involved in a legal effort to protect the sites, and the Federal Ninth Circuit Court of Appeals ruled against Jones seven years later. The vote-pairing sites allegedly tallied 1,412 Nader supporters in Florida who voted for Gore.
- The actions of the Florida Supreme Court. At the time, six of the Court's seven justices were Democratic appointees. It was argued, particularly by Republicans, that the court was exceeding its authority and issuing partisan rulings biased in Gore's favor. On November 17, the court acted "on its own motion" to stay official certification of the election until it could hear Gore's appeal of Harris's decision to reject late-filed hand recounts, while specifically allowing counting of absentee and other ballots to continue, an action the Gore legal team did not request. Similarly, in a 4–3 decision on December 8, the court ordered a statewide counting of undervotes, which Gore's team had also not requested. Among other Republicans, James Baker called this ruling "inconsistent with Florida law", on which basis Bush appealed to the U.S. Supreme Court. Democrats argued that the Florida Supreme Court was simply trying to ensure a fair and accurate count.
- While the Bush campaign opposed the Gore campaign's requests for manual recounts in four heavily Democratic counties, it quietly accepted manual recounts in four Republican-leaning counties. Polk, Hamilton, Seminole, and Taylor, which used the more reliable optical scanners and manually examined unreadable ballots (both undervotes and overvotes) during the electronic recounts in accordance with those counties' existing policies (see County-by-county standards below). These manual counts gained Bush 185 votes.

=== Palm Beach County's butterfly ballot ===
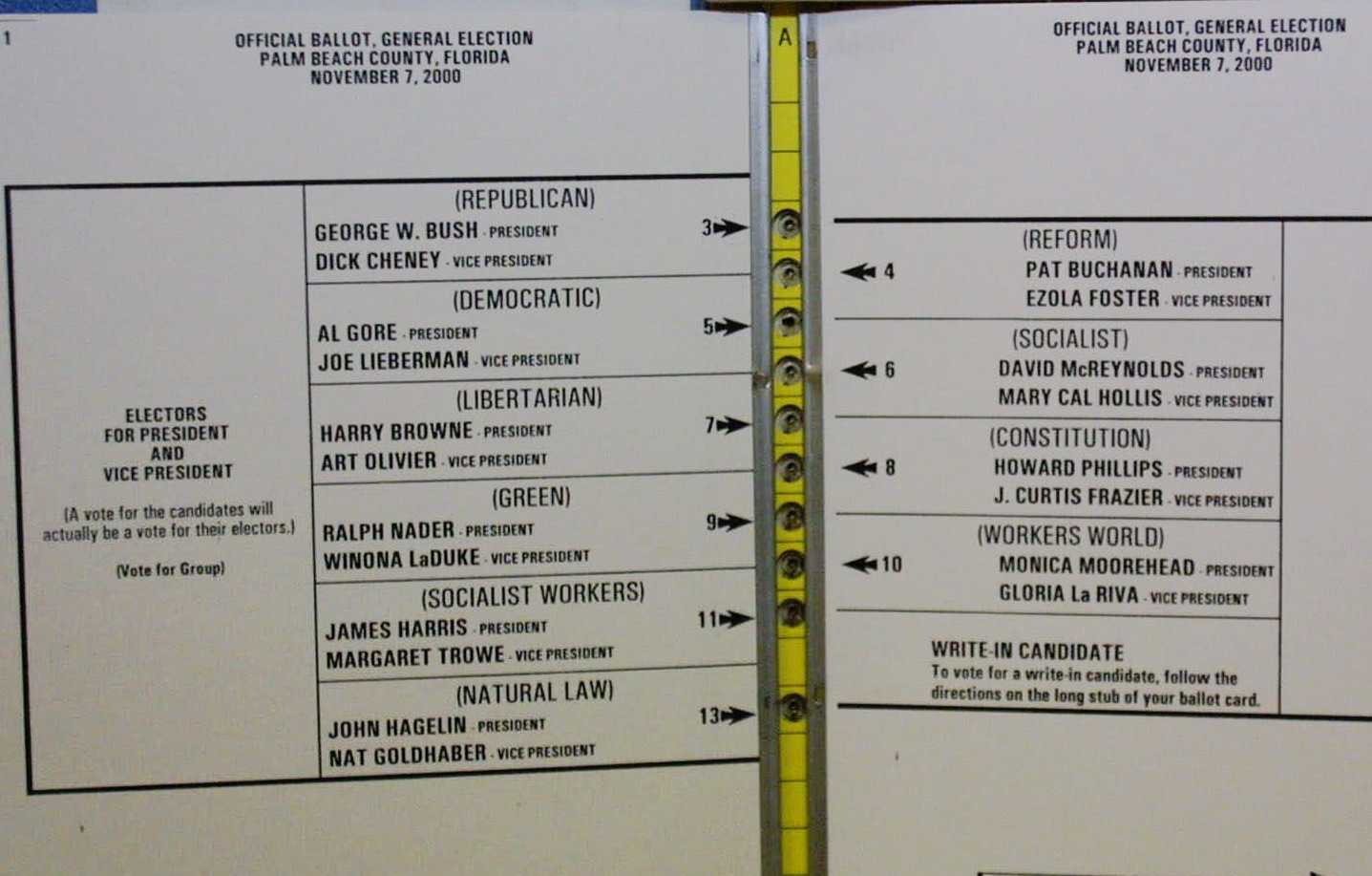
Simulation of the "butterfly ballot"

Many voters in Palm Beach County who intended to vote for Gore actually marked their ballots for Pat Buchanan or spoiled their ballots because they found the ballot's layout confusing. The ballot displayed the list of presidential running-mate pairs alternately across two adjacent pages, with a column of punch spaces down the middle. Bush's name appeared at the top of the ballot, sparing most Bush voters from error. About 19,000 ballots were spoiled because of overvotes (two votes in the same race), compared to 3,000 in 1996. According to a 2001 study in the American Political Science Review, the voting errors caused by the butterfly ballot cost Gore the election: "Had PBC used a ballot format in the presidential race that did not lead to systematic biased voting errors, our findings suggest that, other things equal, Al Gore would have won a majority of the officially certified votes in Florida."

On November 9, 2000, Buchanan said on The Today Show, "When I took one look at that ballot on Election Night ... it's very easy for me to see how someone could have voted for me in the belief they voted for Al Gore."

Bush spokesman Ari Fleischer said on November 9 that "Palm Beach County is a Pat Buchanan stronghold and that's why Pat Buchanan received 3,407 votes there". Buchanan's Florida coordinator, Jim McConnell, called that "nonsense", and Jim Cunningham, chairman of the executive committee of Palm Beach County's Reform Party, responded: "I don't think so. Not from where I'm sitting and what I'm looking at." Cunningham estimated that Palm Beach County's Buchanan supporters numbered between 400 and 500. Asked how many votes he would guess Buchanan legitimately received in Palm Beach County, he said: "I think 1,000 would be generous. Do I believe that these people inadvertently cast their votes for Pat Buchanan? Yes, I do. We have to believe that based on the vote totals elsewhere."

The ballot had been redesigned earlier that year by Supervisor of Elections Theresa LePore, a member of the Democratic Party. She said that she used both sides of the ballot in order to make the candidate names larger, so that the county's elderly residents could see the names more easily.

=== Influential decisions ===
==== Florida Supreme Court appeals ====
Florida Supreme Court spokesman Craig Waters

The case of Palm Beach Canvassing Board v. Katherine Harris (also known as Harris I) was a lawsuit about whether county canvassing boards had authority to extend manual recounts in order to inspect ballots for which the machine counter did not register a vote. The court ruled that counties had that authority, and to allow time for these efforts, extended the statutory deadline for the manual recounts. It also stayed the state certification to November 26.

There were two main issues:

- Whether the county canvassing boards' authority to conduct manual recounts to correct "errors in the vote tabulation" extended to efforts to remedy situations where machines, though perhaps correctly functioning to detect properly marked ballots, did not count votes on certain ballots on which votes might be found under a manual inspection with an "intent of the voter" standard (Harris had ruled that it did not); and
- How such recounts in the case at hand could be made to fit into the statutory scheme, which, as Harris interpreted it, contemplated a quick certification followed, if necessary, by an election contest during which a court (rather than the canvassing boards) would be empowered to correct errors.

Regarding the first issue, the court ruled that, while Harris was generally entitled to deference in her interpretation of state laws, in this case the interpretation "contravene[d] the plain meaning" of the phrase "error in the vote tabulation" and so must be overturned.

Regarding the second issue, the court ruled that the statutory scheme must be interpreted in light of the Florida state constitution's declaration that "all political power is inherent in the people," with any ambiguities therefore construed "liberally". Preventing the canvassing boards from continuing to conduct recounts beyond the seven-day timeframe (specified in the law, but with ambiguity as to how firm it was intended to be), would "summarily disenfranchise innocent electors [voters]" and could not be allowed unless the recounts continued for so long as to "compromise the integrity of the electoral process." The court ordered counties to submit returns by November 26, until which time the stay of certification would stand.

Aside from this case, also in dispute were the criteria that each county's canvassing board would use in examining the overvotes and/or undervotes. Numerous local court rulings went both ways, some ordering recounts because the vote was so close and others declaring that a selective manual recount in a few heavily Democratic counties would be unfair.

Eventually, the Gore campaign appealed to the Florida Supreme Court, which ordered the recount to proceed. The Bush campaign subsequently appealed to the Supreme Court of the United States, which took up the case Bush v. Palm Beach County Canvassing Board on December 1. On December 4, the U.S. Supreme Court returned this matter to the Florida Supreme Court with an order vacating its earlier decision. In its opinion, the Supreme Court cited several areas where the Florida Supreme Court had violated both the federal and Florida constitutions. The Court further held that it had "considerable uncertainty" as to the reasons given by the Florida Supreme Court for its decision. The Florida Supreme Court clarified its ruling on this matter while the United States Supreme Court was deliberating Bush v. Gore.

At 4:00 p.m. EST on December 8, the Florida Supreme Court, by a 4 to 3 vote, rejected Gore's original four-county approach and ordered a manual recount, under the supervision of the Leon County Circuit Court and Leon County Elections Supervisor Ion Sancho, of all undervoted ballots in all Florida counties (except Broward, Palm Beach and Volusia) and the portion of Miami-Dade county in which such a recount was not already complete. That decision was announced on live worldwide television by the Florida Supreme Court's spokesman Craig Waters, the Court's public information officer. The results of this tally were to be added to the November 26 tally.

==== U.S. Supreme Court proceedings ====
The recount was in progress on December 9 when the United States Supreme Court, by a 5 to 4 vote (Justices Stevens, Souter, Ginsburg and Breyer dissenting), granted Bush's emergency plea for a stay of the Florida Supreme Court recount ruling, stopping the incomplete recount.

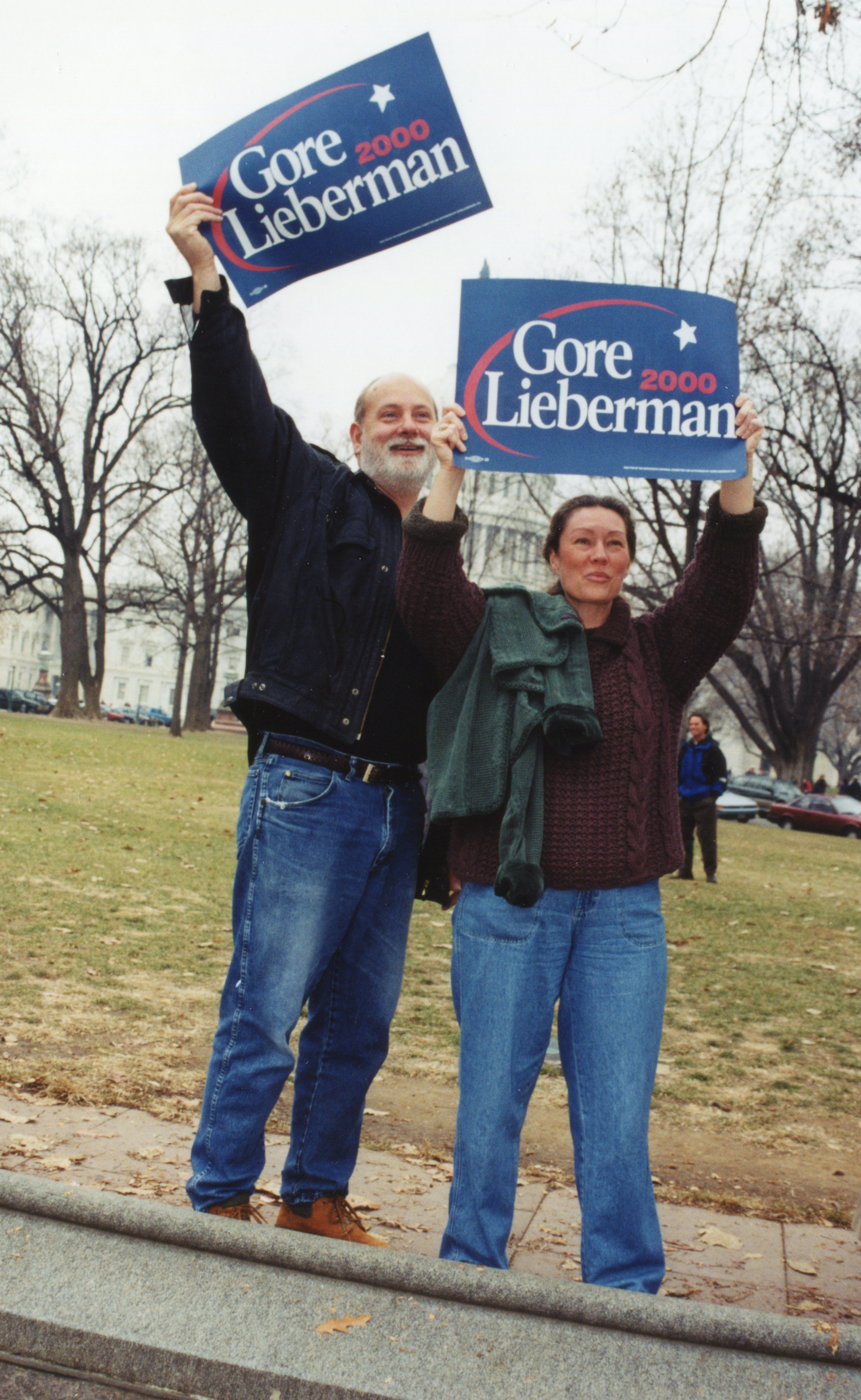
Supporters for the Gore-Lieberman ticket outside the U.S. Supreme Court on December 11

About 10 p.m. EST on December 12, the United States Supreme Court handed down its ruling. Seven of the nine justices saw constitutional problems with the Equal Protection Clause of the United States Constitution in the Florida Supreme Court's plan for recounting ballots, citing differing vote-counting standards from county to county and the lack of a single judicial officer to oversee the recount. By a 5–4 vote the justices reversed and remanded the case to the Florida Supreme Court "for further proceedings not inconsistent with this opinion", prior to the optional "safe harbor" deadline which the Florida court had said the state intended to meet. With only two hours remaining until the December 12 deadline, the Supreme Court's order effectively ended the recount.

The decision was extremely controversial due to its partisan split and the majority's unusual instruction that its judgment in Bush v. Gore should not set precedent but should be "limited to the present circumstances". Gore said he disagreed with the Court's decision, but conceded the election.

Florida Secretary of State Katherine Harris's certification of the election results was thus upheld, allowing Florida's electoral votes to be cast for Bush, making him president-elect.

==== Florida counties' recount decisions ====
Florida Attorney General Bob Butterworth in his advisory opinion to county canvassing boards wrote:

The longstanding case law in Florida [ ] has held that the intent of the voters as shown by their ballots should be given effect. Where a ballot is so marked as to plainly indicate the voter's choice and intent, it should be counted as marked unless some positive provision of law would be violated. As the state has moved toward electronic voting, nothing in this evolution has diminished the standards first articulated in such [judicial] decisions ... that the intent of the voter is of paramount concern and should be given effect if the voter has complied with the statutory requirement and that intent may be determined. ... The Florida Statutes contemplate that where electronic or electromechanical voting systems are used, no vote is to be declared invalid or void if there is a clear indication of the intent of the voter as determined by the county canvassing board.

Conservative writer Andrew Sullivan in a contemporaneous article:

There is a real issue here about what voting actually means. To some, voting is a right that should be guaranteed regardless of any incompetence, error, failure, or irresponsibility on the part of the voter. ... Others have a different view. They argue that American democracy is ... a far stricter, Lockean, Anglo-American system based on the letter of the law and a successful vote cast by a rational, responsible voter. In this constitutional system, the "will of the people" is an irrelevant abstraction. ... From affirmative action and hate-crime laws it's a small step to ensuring that all voters, however negligent, have their intent, however vague, reflected in the final result of an election.

Florida Code Section 101.5614[5] states that no vote "shall be declared invalid or void if there is a clear indication of the intent of the voter." A physical mark on a ballot, at or near a designated target, is such an indication.

Pre-certification decisions that altered certified Florida 2000 presidential vote total
Decision-makers	Decisions	Impact on vote count (Note: Positive sign indicates number of votes that decision caused to be included (or put back) in state certified total. Negative sign indicates number of votes that decision caused to be excluded from state certified total.)	
Decision-makers	Decisions	Gore	Bush
Canvassing boards around the state	Decisions by some canvassing boards to count illegal overseas absentee ballots. (Note: Ballots received after deadline, lacking required postmarks, unsigned, undated, cast after election day, from unregistered voters or voters not requesting ballots, lacking witness signature or address, or double-counted.) At Thanksgiving, decisions by 14 county boards to reverse prior decisions in order to include 288 ballots that had been rejected days earlier. (Note: The NORC study (see below) did not address either of the concerns about overseas absentee ballots and Nassau County's certification change, as their effects were already included in the baseline totals.)	194 (Note: Dr. Gary King of Harvard University applied statistical modeling to determine that the best estimate for the impact of illegal votes would reduce the certified vote margin for Bush from 537 to 245.)	486
Canvassing boards of Alachua, Bay, Bradford, Charlotte, Columbia, Escambia, Franklin, Gulf, Hendry, Hernando, Holmes, Lake, Manatee, Okaloosa, Okeechobee, St. Johns and Washington Counties	Election day decisions by 17 Optiscan counties not to "manually review overvotes that couldn't be properly read by machine" (Note: According to standards being applied by each county at the time. Two-coder general agreement for punch-card counties.) (Note: Taylor County determined voter intent on some overvotes; however, it did not include them in its certified results.)	-1,278	-826
Canvassing boards of Alachua, Bay, Charlotte, Citrus, Columbia, Escambia, Franklin, Gadsden, Holmes, Jackson, Lake, Leon, Manatee, Monroe, Okaloosa, Okeechobee, St. Johns, Suwanee and Washington Counties	Election day decisions by 19 Optiscan counties not to "manually review undervotes that couldn't be read by counting machines" (Note: Even though four other Optiscan counties (Hamilton, Polk, Seminole, Taylor) manually reviewed machine-rejected ballots for votes to include in their certified totals, there were still an additional 156 undervotes for Bush and Gore that could be reclaimed in these counties under the county custom standard, according to the NORC study (see below). Those 156 votes are included in this line's totals.)	-789 (Note: Includes increase in Orange County's unofficially revised machine-tabulated vote total, due to machine later counting 512 ballots that were previously machine-rejected ("could not be distinguished from ballots that were accepted and counted – they appeared to be properly completed"): Gore 249, Bush 184 (total 433))	-733
Canvassing boards of Collier, DeSoto, Dixie, Duval, Glades, Hardee, Highlands, Hillsborough, Indian River, Jefferson, Lee, Madison, Marion, Miami-Dade, Nassau, Osceola, Pasco, Pinellas, Sarasota, Sumter and Wakulla Counties	Election day decisions by 21 punch-card counties not to "attempt to determine voter intent on undervotes that couldn't be read by counting machines" (Note: Amount excludes 139 Miami-Dade precincts that were recounted.)	-1,310	-1,858
The above 21 boards plus Palm Beach County Canvassing Board	Election day decisions by 22 punch-card counties not to "attempt to determine voter intent on overvotes that couldn't be properly read by machine" (Note: Unlike the other 20 counties, Palm Beach and Pasco Counties determined voter intent on 74 overvotes for Gore and Bush; however, they did not include them in their certified results.)	-396	-189
Palm Beach County Canvassing Board	Decision not to review dimpled ballots with clear indications of intent (Note: Of these 4,842 excluded ballots, 4,513 had been set aside by the canvassing board for later inspection by a court (which never happened). All were among 10,310 undervotes in the county. The "set aside" ballots were dimpled ballots that were challenged by the two parties. A January 2001 review by the Palm Beach Post of those "set-aside" ballots determined that 4,318 were "unambiguous" valid votes.)	-2,735	-2,107
Nassau County Canvassing Board	Decision to change county's certified vote from the mechanical recount total back to the election night vote total	73	124
Secretary of State Katherine Harris	Decision not to include Palm Beach County's vote recount results (all but 53 precincts) submitted before certification deadline (Note: When Palm Beach County completed its recount two hours after the certification deadline, its final count was Gore 501 votes, Bush 327 votes excluded from the state certified total.)	-480	-265
Secretary of State Katherine Harris	Decision not to include Miami-Dade County's vote recount results (139 precincts) accomplished before certification deadline	-302	-134
Impact of all decisions on candidates' potential statewide totals		-7,023	-5,502
Potential statewide vote count in absence of all decisions (Note: On December 9, 2000, four counties (Leon, Liberty, Madison, Manatee) completed recounts of undervotes ordered by the Florida Supreme Court, identifying a small number of new votes. Escambia County also reported completing its recount that day but did not include all of its precincts.)		2,919,276	2,918,292
		48.852%	48.836%
Gore by 984

== Post-election studies ==
According to factcheck.org, "Nobody can say for sure who might have won. A full, official recount of all votes statewide could have gone either way, but one was never conducted." CNN and PBS reported that, had the recount continued with its existing standards, Bush would likely have still tallied more votes, but variations of those standards (and/or of which precincts were recounted) could have swung the election either way. They also concluded that had a full recount of all undervotes and overvotes taken place, Gore would have won, though his legal team never pursued such an option.

=== NORC-sponsored Florida Ballot Project recount ===
The National Opinion Research Center at the University of Chicago, sponsored by a consortium of major U.S. news organizations, conducted the Florida Ballot Project, a comprehensive review of ballots collected from the entire state, not just the disputed counties that were recounted. NORC investigators were able to examine 175,010 ballots, 99.2% of Florida's total, but county officials were unable to deliver "as many as 2,200 problem ballots" to NORC. Some counties produced their rejected ballots by rerunning all ballots through tabulation machines but were unable to deliver all problem ballots because machines accepted more ballots than previously certified and rejected fewer. The project ended up using a sample that was 1,333 votes fewer than the expected total of votes, with most of the variation in Votomatic overvotes, the ballots least likely to yield votes in a recount. The 175,010 ballots examined contained undervotes (votes with no choice made for president) and overvotes (votes made with more than one choice marked). The organization analyzed 61,190 undervotes and 113,820 overvotes. Of the overvotes, 68,476 chose Gore and a minor candidate; 23,591 chose Bush and a minor candidate. Because there was no clear indication of what the voters intended, those numbers were not included in the consortium's final tabulations.

The project's goal was to determine the reliability and accuracy of the systems used in the voting process, including how different systems correlated with voter mistakes. The undervotes and overvotes in Florida amounted to 3% of all votes cast in the state. The review's findings were reported in the media during the week after November 12, 2001, by the organizations that funded the recount: Associated Press, CNN, The Wall Street Journal, The New York Times, The Washington Post, St. Petersburg Times, The Palm Beach Post and Tribune Publishing, which included the Los Angeles Times, South Florida Sun-Sentinel, Orlando Sentinel and Chicago Tribune.

Based on the NORC review, the media group concluded that if the disputes over the validity of all the ballots in question had been consistently resolved and any uniform standard applied, the electoral result would have been reversed and Gore would have won by 60 to 171 votes (with, for each punch ballot, at least two of the three ballot reviewers' codes being in agreement). The standards that were chosen for the NORC study ranged from a "most restrictive" standard (accepts only so-called perfect ballots that machines somehow missed and did not count, or ballots with unambiguous expressions of voter intent) to a "most inclusive" standard (applies a uniform standard of "dimple or better" on punch marks and "all affirmative marks" on optical scan ballots).

An analysis of the NORC data by University of Pennsylvania researcher Steven F. Freeman and journalist Joel Bleifuss concluded that, no matter what standard is used, after a recount of all uncounted votes, Gore would have been the victor. Such a statewide review including all uncounted votes was a tangible possibility, as Leon County Circuit Court Judge Terry Lewis, whom the Florida Supreme Court had assigned to oversee the statewide recount, had scheduled a hearing for December 13 (mooted by the U.S. Supreme Court's final ruling on December 12) to consider including overvotes. Subsequent statements by Lewis and internal court documents support the likelihood that overvotes would have been included in the recount. Florida State University professor of public policy Lance deHaven-Smith observed that, even considering only undervotes, "under any of the five most reasonable interpretations of the Florida Supreme Court ruling, Gore does, in fact, more than make up the deficit". Fairness and Accuracy in Reporting's analysis of the NORC study and media coverage of it supported these interpretations and criticized the coverage of the study by media outlets such as The New York Times and the other media consortium members for focusing on how events might have played out rather than on the statewide vote count.

Outcomes of potential recount scenarios in Florida presidential election 2000 (NORC, Florida Ballot Project)
Recount criteria		Margin in Florida (Note: two-coder general agreement for punch card ballots)	Total new votes for Bush and Gore
Review of all uncounted ballots statewide (never undertaken by Florida)
•	County custom standard: what each individual county canvassing board considered a vote, in regard to both undervotes and overvotes.	Gore by 171	10,480
•	Most restrictive standard: requires fully punched chads and complete fills on optical scan ballots, no overvotes	Gore by 115	5,332
•	Most inclusive standard: any dimpled chads, any affirmative mark on optical scan ballots; includes optical scan overvotes.	Gore by 107	24,240
•	Prevailing standard: requires at least one corner of chad detached on punch card undervotes; any affirmative mark on optical scan ballots; includes overvotes (Note: Officials in a majority of punch-card counties said they would accept a single-corner detached chad as an indicator of voter intent, and officials in a majority of optical scan counties said they would accept all affirmative marks as described in NORC codes as indicators of voter intent. These standards are applied to both undervotes and overvotes.)	Gore by 60	7,811
Review of limited sets of uncounted ballots (initiated but not completed)
•	Gore request for recounts in four counties: (Note: rejected by the Florida Supreme Court in its ruling of December 8, 2000) applies the above "prevailing standard" (but with no overvotes) to remaining uncounted ballots in Miami-Dade; accepts uncertified hand counts from Palm Beach and 139 precincts in Miami-Dade and certified counts from other 65 counties	Bush by 225	1,434
•	Florida Supreme Court order: accepts completed recounts for Broward, Palm Beach, Volusia and Miami-Dade (139 precincts); applies the above "prevailing standard" (but with no overvotes) to remaining Miami-Dade and other 63 counties	Bush by 430	5,383
•	Florida Supreme Court order as being implemented: accepts completed recounts in eight counties and certified counts from four counties that refused to recount; (Note: the lightly populated counties of Gadsden, Hamilton, Lafayette and Union) applies the above "county custom standard" to remaining Miami-Dade and other 55 counties (Note: Nine counties (Alachua, Columbia, DeSoto, Glades, Lake, Sarasota, Seminole, Sumter and Wakulla) reported that it was their intent to count reclaimable overvotes under the Florida Supreme Court order. Nine other counties said that it was a possibility, while 49 counties said that they would not have counted reclaimable overvotes per the court's order.)	Bush by 493	7,582
Unofficial recount totals
•	Incomplete result when the Supreme Court stayed the recount (December 9, 2000)	Bush by 154 (Note: When the Florida Supreme Court ordered a statewide recount of remaining uncounted undervotes, it stipulated that the incomplete results from Palm Beach and Miami-Dade Counties that had been rejected by Katherine Harris be counted. This immediately reduced the Bush margin from 537 to 154 (537–215–168 is 154).)
Certified Result (official final count)
•	Recounts included from Volusia and Broward only	Bush by 537

Voting technology	Total reclaimable ballots from Florida 2000 presidential election		Reclaimable undervote ballots from Florida 2000		
Voting technology	Overvotes (Note: Primarily write-in overvotes)	Undervotes	Characteristics	No. Bush and Gore	Other candidates
Punchcard	721	18,610	Fully punched proper vote	646	678
Punchcard	721	18,610	2- or 3-corner detached chads	951	678
Punchcard	721	18,610	Dimple or 1-corner detached chads	15,141	292
Punchcard	721	18,610	Other (marginal) ballots	902 (Note: ballots recorded by the assigned review coders as either having "multiple marks" or no punches in the presidential section of ballots, or having indications of voter intent (that meet dynamic filter criteria) recorded by just one of three coders)	
Optical scan	3008	2826	Properly filled, not read by machine (Note: Orange County total of 512 properly filled ballots not read by machine on November 8, 2000. Possible reasons include, but are not limited to, ambient humidity, feeder misalignment and scanner light sensitivity.)	433	79
Optical scan	3008	2826	Wrong ink color/carbon content (oval/arrow filled)	796	116
Optical scan	3008	2826	Underfilled oval/arrow	393	116
Optical scan	3008	2826	Mark away from oval/arrow	1,009	116

The NORC was expecting 176,446 uncounted ballots to be available from Florida's counties, based on county precinct reports that produced the final, state-certified vote totals.

Orange County presented fewer rejected ballots to the NORC than expected. When the county segregated all ballots by machine for the NORC review, 512 previously rejected ballots were determined to be completely valid. Orange County then performed a hand segregation and determined that these votes numbered 184 for Bush, 249 for Gore and 79 for other candidates.

The NORC adjusted its analysis for the Orange County results and a few minor differences by increasing the starting baseline vote total by 535 votes. In addition, some counties had provided an extra 432 total ballots, while others produced 1,333 fewer ballots than expected. As adjusted, 176,343 ballots were expected, compared to 175,010 ballots actually provided to the NORC for review. The county-level variance from the total number of ballots was 0.76%. Thus the project included a sample within less than 1% of the expected total of votes.

Only a fourth of the variance consisted of optical ballots. Most of the variation occurred in Votomatic overvotes, the least likely ballots to yield votes in a recount. Among the nearly 85,000 Votomatic overvotes in the sample, only 721 reclaimable votes were confirmed in the NORC study.

=== Media recounts ===
From the beginning of the controversy, politicians, litigants and the press focused exclusively on the undervotes, in particular incompletely punched hanging chads. Undervotes (ballots that did not register any vote when counted by machine) were the subject of much media coverage, most of the lawsuits and the Florida Supreme Court ruling. After the election, recounts conducted by various United States news media organizations continued to focus on undervotes. Based on the review of these ballots, their results indicated that Bush would have won if certain recounting methods had been used (including the one favored by Gore at the time of the Supreme Court decision), but that Gore might have won under other standards and scenarios. The post-controversy recounts revealed that, "if a manual recount had been limited to undervotes, it would have produced an inaccurate picture of the electorate's position."

USA Today, The Miami Herald, and Knight Ridder commissioned accounting firm BDO Seidman to count undervotes. BDO Seidman's results, reported in USA Today, show that under the strictest standard, where only a cleanly punched ballot with a fully removed chad was counted, Gore's margin was three votes. Under the other standards used in the study, Bush's margin of victory increased as looser standards were used. The standards considered by BDO Seidman were:

- Lenient standard. Any alteration in a chad, ranging from a dimple to a full punch, counts as a vote. By this standard, Bush margin: 1,665 votes.
- Palm Beach standard. A dimple is counted as a vote if other races on the same ballot show dimples as well. By this standard, Bush margin: 884 votes.
- Two-corner standard. A chad with two or more corners removed is counted as a vote. This is the most common standard in use. By this standard, Bush margin: 363 votes.
- Strict standard. Only a fully removed chad counts as a vote. By this standard, Gore margin: 3 votes.

The study notes that because of the possibility of mistakes, it is difficult to conclude that Gore would have won under the strict standard or that a high degree of certainty obtained in the study's results. It also remarks that there were variations between examiners and that election officials often did not provide the same number of undervotes as were counted on Election Day. Furthermore, the study did not consider overvotes, ballots that registered more than one vote when counted by machine.

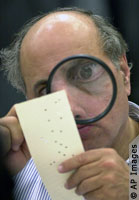
Broward County judge Robert Rosenberg examines a punch card.

The study also found that undervotes originating in optical-scan counties differ from those from punch card counties in a particular characteristic. Undervotes from punch card counties give new votes to candidates in roughly the same proportion as the county's official vote. Furthermore, the number of undervotes correlates with how well the punch-card machines are maintained, and not with factors such as race or socioeconomic status. Undervotes from optical-scan counties, however, correlate with Democratic votes more than Republican votes, and in particular to counties that scanned ballots at a central location rather than at precinct locations. Optical-scan counties were the only places in the study where Gore gained more votes than Bush, 1,036 to 775.

Some media reports focused on undervotes (chad blocked hole, wrong ink or pencil used, partial oval mark not detected, humidity affected scanner, ballot feeder misalignment), while others also included overvotes (hole punched or oval filled plus a write-in name, other multi-marked ballots). A larger consortium of news organizations, including USA Today, The Miami Herald, Knight Ridder, The Tampa Tribune, and five other newspapers next conducted a full recount of all machine-rejected ballots, including both undervotes and overvotes. The organization analyzed 171,908 ballots (60,647 undervotes and 111,261 overvotes), 3,102 less than the later NORC study. According to their results, Bush won under stricter standards and Gore won under looser standards. A Gore win was impossible without a recount of overvotes, which he did not request; however, faxes between Judge Terry Lewis and the canvassing boards throughout the state indicated that Lewis, who oversaw the recount effort, intended to have overvotes counted.

According to the study, 3,146 (3%) of the 111,261 examined overvotes "contained clear and therefore legally valid votes not counted in any of the manual recounts during the dispute." According to Anthony Salvado, a political scientist at the University of California, Irvine, who acted as a consultant on the media recount, most of the errors were caused by ballot design, ballot wording, and efforts by voters to choose both a president and a vice president. For example, 21,188 of the Florida overvotes, or nearly one-fifth of the total, originated from Duval County, where the presidential ballot was split across two pages and voters were instructed to "vote every page". Half of the overvotes in Duval County had one presidential candidate marked on each page, making their vote illegal under Florida law. Salvado says that this alone cost Gore the election.

Including overvotes in the above totals for undervotes gives different margins of victory:

- Lenient standard. Gore margin: 332 votes.
- Palm Beach standard. Gore margin: 242 votes.
- Two-corner standard. Bush margin: 407 votes.
- Strict standard. Bush margin: 152 votes.

The overvotes with write-in names were also noted by Florida State University public policy professor and elections observer, Lance deHaven-Smith, in his interview with Research in Review at Florida State University:

...Everybody had thought that the chads were where all the bad ballots were, but it turned out that the ones that were the most decisive were write-in ballots where people would check Gore and write Gore in, and the machine kicked those out. There were 175,000 votes overall that were so-called "spoiled ballots". About two-thirds of the spoiled ballots were over-votes; many or most of them would have been write-in over-votes, where people had punched and written in a candidate's name. And nobody looked at this, not even the Florida Supreme Court in the last decision it made requiring a statewide recount. Nobody had thought about it except Judge Terry Lewis, who was overseeing the statewide recount when it was halted by the U.S. Supreme Court. The write-in over-votes have really not gotten much attention. Those votes are not ambiguous. When you see Gore picked and then Gore written in, there's not a question in your mind who this person was voting for. When you go through those, they're unambiguous: Bush got some of those votes, but they were overwhelmingly for Gore. For example, in an analysis of the 2.7 million votes that had been cast in Florida's eight largest counties, The Washington Post found that Gore's name was punched on 46,000 of the over-vote ballots it, [sic] while Bush's name was marked on only 17,000... –Lance deHaven-Smith

Furthermore, the Florida Administrative Code: 1S-2.0031, "Write-in Procedures Governing Electronic Voting Systems", (7) at the time specified, "An overvote shall occur when an elector casts a vote on the ballot card and also casts a write-in vote for a qualified write-in candidate for that same office. Upon such an overvote, the entire vote for that office shall be void and shall not be counted. However, an overvote shall not occur when the elector casts a vote on the ballot card but then enters a sham or unqualified name in the write-in space for that same office. In such case, only the write-in vote is void." There were two write-in candidates for president who had been qualified by the state of Florida. Under the FAC, a ballot with any other name written in (including Bush and Gore, who were not qualified as write-in candidates) was not an overvote, but rather a valid vote for the candidate whose name was marked by the voter.

=== County-by-county standards for write-in overvotes in 2000 ===
Optiscan counties' standards for valid write-in overvotes	Counties that	do not count any votes for the marked candidate (4):	Columbia, Holmes, Okaloosa, Suwannee
Optiscan counties' standards for valid write-in overvotes	Counties that count votes for the marked candidate if the write-in is	an opposing candidate (0):	none
Optiscan counties' standards for valid write-in overvotes	Counties that count votes for the marked candidate if the write-in is	the same name (1):	Hendry
Optiscan counties' standards for valid write-in overvotes	Counties that count votes for the marked candidate if the write-in is	the same name or a blank space (28):	Bay, Bradford, Brevard, Calhoun, Charlotte, Citrus, Clay, Escambia, Gadsden, Gulf, Hamilton, Hernando, Jackson, Lafayette, Lake, Levy, Liberty, Okeechobee, Orange, Polk, Putnam, Santa Rosa, Seminole, St. Johns, St. Lucie, Union, Walton, Washington
Optiscan counties' standards for valid write-in overvotes	Counties that count votes for the marked candidate if the write-in is	the same name, a blank space or a historical or fictional name (1):	Franklin
Optiscan counties' standards for valid write-in overvotes	Counties that count votes for the marked candidate if the write-in is	the same name, a blank space or an uncertified person's name (Note: in answer to "Would the county accept a write-in overvote if the write-in text area contained a non-qualified candidate?") (1):	Flagler
Optiscan counties' standards for valid write-in overvotes	Counties that count votes for the marked candidate if the write-in is	the same name, a blank space, a historical or fictional name or an uncertified person's name (7):	Alachua, Baker, Leon, Manatee, Monroe, Taylor, Volusia
Punchcard counties' standards for valid write-in overvotes	Counties that	do not count any votes for the marked candidate (9):	DeSoto, Duval, Gilchrist, Glades, Hardee, Miami-Dade, Nassau, Osceola, Sarasota
Punchcard counties' standards for valid write-in overvotes	Counties that	count votes for the punched candidate if the write-in is an uncertified person's name (12):	Broward, Collier, Dixie, Hillsborough, Jefferson, Lee, Madison, Marion, Palm Beach, Pasco, Pinellas, Wakulla
Punchcard counties' standards for valid write-in overvotes		n/a or no answer (4):	Highlands, Indian River, Martin, Sumter

=== Opinion polling on recount ===
A nationwide December 14–21, 2000 Harris poll asked, "If everyone who tried to vote in Florida had their votes counted for the candidate who they thought they were voting for—with no misleading ballots and infallible voting machines—who do you think would have won the election, George W. Bush or Al Gore?". The results were 49% for Gore and 40% for Bush, with 11% uncertain or not wishing to respond.

== Television film ==
The Florida recount was the subject of the 2008 television film Recount, which aired on HBO. Directed by Jay Roach, it starred Kevin Spacey as Ron Klain, Bob Balaban as Benjamin Ginsberg, Ed Begley Jr. as David Boies, Laura Dern as Katherine Harris, John Hurt as Warren Christopher, Denis Leary as Michael Whouley, Bruce McGill as Mac Stipanovich, and Tom Wilkinson as James Baker. It won Outstanding Television Movie at the Primetime Emmy Awards, with Roach winning Outstanding Directing for a Limited Series, Movie, or Dramatic Special, and Dern a Golden Globe Award for Best Supporting Actress – Series, Miniseries or Television Film.

== See also ==
- 2016 United States presidential election recounts
- 2006 United States House of Representatives elections in Florida
