= Michael Connell =

American political consultant

Michael Louis Connell (November 30, 1963 – December 19, 2008) was a high-level Republican consultant who was subpoenaed in a case regarding alleged tampering with the 2004 U.S. presidential election and a case involving thousands of missing emails pertaining to the political firing of U.S. Attorneys. Connell was killed when the plane he was flying crashed on December 19, 2008.

== Life ==
Connell was originally from Illinois and lived in Bath Township, near Akron, Ohio. His company also maintained a website for the Swift Boat Veterans for Truth 527 group during the 2004 election.

== Request for protection ==
In July 2008, the lead attorney in the King Lincoln Bronzeville Neighborhood Association v. Blackwell case, Cliff Arnebeck, sent a letter to U.S. Attorney General Michael Mukasey seeking protection for Connell as a witness in the case, saying he had been threatened. Arnebeck wrote, "We have been confidentially informed by a source we believe to be credible that Karl Rove has threatened Michael Connell, a principal witness we have identified in our King Lincoln case in federal court in Columbus, Ohio, that if he does not agree to 'take the fall' for election fraud in Ohio, his wife Heather will be prosecuted for supposed lobby law violations." Arnebeck claims that months later, his source called back and warned that Connell's life was in danger.

He was served with a subpoena in Ohio on September 22, 2008, in a case alleging that vote-tampering during the 2004 presidential election resulted in civil rights violations. Connell, president of GovTech Solutions and New Media Communications, was a website designer and IT professional and created a website for Ohio Secretary of State Ken Blackwell that presented the results of the 2004 election in real time as they were tabulated. At the time, Blackwell was also chairman of the Bush-Cheney 2004 reelection effort in Ohio. Connell refused to testify or to produce documents relating to the system used in the 2004 and 2006 elections, lawyers said.

== Death ==
At about 6 p.m. on December 19, 2008, Connell was killed, at the age of 45, in the crash of a single-engine 1997 Piper Saratoga private airplane, which he was flying, which occurred in Lake Township, between 2.5 and 3 miles short of the runway at the Akron-Canton Airport near Akron, Ohio. Connell was alone in the plane and had been returning from the College Park Airport in Maryland, near Washington, D.C. The plane crashed on its final approach to the airport's main runway, between two houses, one of which was vacant. Connell had flown the plane from the Akron-Canton Airport to the College Park Airport on December 18, 2008; according to the Stark County, Ohio coroner, Connell had on his person a receipt for a breakfast he had purchased in Washington, D.C., on December 19, 2008.

On December 31, 2008, it was reported that air traffic controllers had noted that Connell was off course, that they had been in communication with him regarding this, and that he had been trying to get back on course at the time of the crash. There were reported to have been no signs of mechanical problems with the plane.

The National Transportation Safety Board published its final report into the accident that killed Connell on January 28, 2010. The board concluded that Connell had lost control of the aircraft as a result of disorientation while turning in cloud. During a pre-flight briefing Connell had commented that he wanted to return to Akron before the weather "went from bad to worse". Several other pilots in the vicinity had reported severe icing at the time of the crash; Connell's aircraft was not equipped or approved to fly in icing conditions.
