= Unilect =

Unilect (also stylized as UniLect) is a punch card voting machine manufacturer based in Dublin, California. Its main product is the Patriot touchscreen voting machine, which was introduced in 1992.

== History ==
Unilect was founded in 1989 by Jack Gerbel, who previously founded Computer Election Systems, and is the president as of 2006. During the 2000s, its machines were sold in Michigan, North Carolina, South Carolina, Pennsylvania, Florida, and Virginia. The company had about 20 employees as of 2004.

In 2003, six election vendors formed the Election Technology Council for documenting ethics and security best practices: the Information Technology Association of America, Diebold, Hart InterCivic, Election Systems & Software, Sequoia Voting Systems, and Unilect.

During the 2004 United States elections, in Carteret County, North Carolina, 4,530 votes were irreversibly lost. Local election officials said that Unilect told them each voting machine had a limit of 10,500 votes, but the actual limit was 3,005 votes. Gerbel said that the machines gave a warning message that storage space was running out. Critics responded that the machines should have automatically stopped counting new ballots at this point. The chair of Carteret County's election board said that election officials did not see a warning message. The North Carolina agriculture commissioner election results had a margin lower than the number of lost votes, so it was not certified in time unlike the other races. In December 2004, a new election was ordered by the North Carolina Board of Elections for North Carolina agriculture commissioner. In July 2005, the North Carolina State Legislature voted to stop using Unilect and to mandate paper ballots for all electronic voting systems.

Pennsylvania state officials decertified Unilect in April 2005 due to its machines freezing, not capturing screen touches, and under-counting votes during the 2004 election. In April 2006, Unilect offered to buy back old Patriot machines for $5,000 from Mercer County, Pennsylvania, originally sold for about $900,000 in 2001. County Commissioner Olivia M. Lazor described this offer as "an insult". In May 2006, the county sued Unilect to recover the cost, alleging breach of contract.
