= Terry Lewis (judge) =

American judge

Terry P. Lewis is a retired state circuit judge who presided over cases in the Second Judicial Circuit Court of Florida. He was appointed to that court in 1998 by Governor Lawton Chiles, after serving as a Leon County Court judge from 1989. Lewis is best known for overseeing the Florida recount during the 2000 US presidential election. He is also a writer of legal thriller novels.
