= King Lincoln Bronzeville Neighborhood Ass'n v. Blackwell =

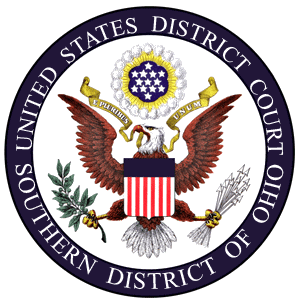
- Court: United States District Court for the Southern District of Ohio
- Full case name: King Lincoln Bronzeville Neighborhood Association, et al. v. J. Kenneth Blackwell, et al.
- Decided: September 11, 2006
- Docket nos.: 2:06-cv-00745
- Citation: 448 F. Supp. 2d 876

Holding
- Blackwell does have the authority to issue a directive to Ohio's 88 county boards of elections to preserve the presidential election ballots, but must preserve said ballots.

Court membership
- Judge sitting: Algenon L. Marbley

King Lincoln Bronzeville Neighborhood Association v. Blackwell, 448 F. Supp. 2d 876 (S.D. Ohio 2006), is a court case filed on August 31, 2006 to define if the Ohio Secretary of State at the time, Kenneth Blackwell, had violated the Civil Rights Act, first, thirteenth, fourteenth, and fifteenth amendments to the United States Constitution through previous election procedure.

== Claims of suit ==
The plaintiffs of the case, Willis Brown, Paul Gregory, Miles Curtiss, Matthew Segal, and Harvey Wasserman filed a civil rights action case on behalf of the King Lincoln Bronzeville Neighborhood Association, the Ohio Voter Rights Alliance for Democracy and the League of Young Voters.

Blackwell, the defendant, was cited in the original complaint as "having conspired to deprive and continue to deprive Ohioans of their right to vote and have, in fact, deprived and continue to deprive Ohioans of their right to vote by, in a selective and discriminatory manner, unfairly allocate election resources (such as voting machines), institute a system of provisional ballots, purge voter registrations, and broke the bi-partisan chain of custody ballots".

== Defense ==
In his response to the amended complaint of the plaintiffs, Blackwell answered by denying allegations that he violated the securities of the Civil Rights Act as enumerated in Paragraph 1 of the amended complaint, that he operated with other parties in Paragraph 2, that he participated in "election fraud, vote dilution, vote suppression, recount fraud and other violations...", that he "arranged for the use of tens of thousands of ballots in high-performance Democratic precincts that were prepunches for a third-party presidential candidate so as to create an overvote and disqualification of such a vote when cast for Kerry" and that he participated in these in an "ongoing conspiracy"

== Motions during case ==
Several motions were filed during the proceedings of the case.

=== Motion to intervene by the State of Ohio ===
Ohio Attorney General Jim Petro filed a motion on behalf of the State of Ohio to "defend the constitutionality...[of] Ohio's Voter Identification Statutes" which was granted.

=== Other motions ===
The plaintiffs also filed a motion to expedite the hearing on the plaintiff's previous request for a preliminary injunction.

== Orders and results ==
Judge Marbley, in an order filed on September 7, 2006, ordered County Board of Elections to save all ballots from the 2004 presidential election.

Additionally, in the 7th filing to the case, Judge Marbley and the court found that "Blackwell does have the authority to issue a directive to Ohio's 88 county boards of elections to preserve the presidential election ballots", that because the case was filed prior to the expiration of the twenty-two month preservation period (set forth in previous Ohio legislation), Blackwell must preserve said ballots.

Judge Marbley finally stated in an order signed April 6, 2007 in an agreed order that the Secretary of State in 2007, Jennifer Brunner, should "prepare a directive pursuant to R.C. 3501.05 requiring the 88 county boards of elections to transfer the custody of the Secretary of State of Ohio all ballots from the 2004 Presidential election...previously preserved in accordance with the Court's September 11, 2006 Opinion and Order." He further ordered that all ballots be maintained in a "secure location."

In July, 2011, the plaintiffs filed a document purporting to be a contract between Secy. of State Ken Blackwell and Republican computer consultant Michael Connell, specifying the computer architecture that would allow the White House to have access to Ohio vote counts in real time as they were reported on election night, including the ability to modify those numbers remotely.

== Motions for reconsideration ==
Judge Algenon L. Marbley denied a motion for reconsideration on December 22, 2009 (filed date).

== Opinion and Order Dismissing Case Without Prejudice ==
Judge Marbley dismissed the case, on February 7, 2012.

The court found that: (1) the Eleventh Amendment precludes subject matter jurisdiction before this Court, and this case is now DISMISSED without prejudice (2) Plaintiffs have failed to provide factual or legal bases for deposing local Chamber of Commerce members, and therefore their request to depose local Chamber of Commerce members is DENIED; and (3) Plaintiffs have failed to demonstrate an evidentiary basis for the Secretary to continue storing the 2004 election ballots, and therefore their request to retain the ballots is DENIED.
