= Alliance for Democracy (United States) =

American grassroots organization

- Formation: 1996
- Founder: Ronnie Dugger
- Founded at: Hunt, TX
- Headquarters: Hudson, MA

The Alliance for Democracy is a grassroots organization of United States citizens with the stated goal of "free[ing] all people from corporate domination of politics, economics, the environment, culture and information...establish[ing] true democracy; and...creat[ing] a just society with a sustainable, equitable economy."

== History ==
The organization's founding convention was held at Mo Ranch conference center, in Hunt, Texas, United States in 1996 by Ronnie Dugger, founding editor of the Texas Observer, whose article "A Call to Citizens: Will Real Populists Please Stand Up" was published in The Nation in August 1995. He was assisted by Ohio lawyer Cliff Arnebeck. The Alliance's current campaigns focus on public banking, local food and self-governance, fighting the privatization of water and municipal water and sanitation systems, and working to pass local resolutions against the Trans-Pacific Partnership.

The Alliance for Democracy's national office is located in Hudson, Massachusetts.
