= Statewide opinion polling for the 2000 United States presidential election =

2000 United States presidential election polling
- As of November 4, 2000
President before election
Bill Clinton
Democratic
Elected President
George W. Bush
Republican

This article is a collection of statewide opinion polls conducted for the 2000 United States presidential election. The people named in the polls were declared candidates or had received media speculation about their possible candidacy.

== Limitations ==
Poll results can be affected by methodology, especially in how they predict who will vote in the next election, and re-weighting answers to compensate for slightly non-random samples.

== Alabama ==
Poll source	Date(s)	Sample size	Margin of error	George W. Bush (R)	Al Gore (D)	Ralph Nader (G)	Other / undecided (Note: Calculated by taking the difference of 100% and all other listed candidates combined. For polls that do not report a figure for Nader, this includes his support.)
Mason-Dixon Polling & Strategy	November 3, 2000	625	—	55%	38%	—	7%
University of South Alabama Polling Group	November 1, 2000	442	—	48%	28%	1%	23%
Capital Survey Research Center	October 19, 2000	580	—	55%	37%	—	8%
University of South Alabama Polling Group	October 18, 2000	407	—	53%	33%	—	14%

== Alaska ==
Poll source	Date(s)	Sample size	Margin of error	George W. Bush (R)	Al Gore (D)	Ralph Nader (G)	Other / undecided (Note: Calculated by taking the difference of 100% and all other candidates combined.)
Harris Insights & Analytics	November 3, 2000	756	—	54%	31%	10%	5%

== Arizona ==
Poll source	Date(s)	Sample size	Margin of error	George W. Bush (R)	Al Gore (D)	Ralph Nader (G)	Other / undecided (Note: Calculated by taking the difference of 100% and all other listed candidates combined. For polls that do not report a figure for Nader, this includes his support.)
Harris Insights & Analytics	November 3, 2000	4,656	—	52%	40%	5%	3%
Market Solutions Group	October 30, 2000	432	—	49%	39%	3%	9%
SurveyUSA	October 30, 2000	510	—	52%	42%	—	6%
Arizona State University Morrison Institute for Public Policy	October 21, 2000	600 (Note: Sample size unavailable; 600 is a default estimate used in the source dataset.)	—	49%	39%	3%	9%
Rasmussen Reports	October 21, 2000	610	—	49%	37%	—	14%

== Arkansas ==
Poll source	Date(s)	Sample size	Margin of error	George W. Bush (R)	Al Gore (D)	Ralph Nader (G)	Other / undecided (Note: Calculated by taking the difference of 100% and all other listed candidates combined. For polls that do not report a figure for Nader, this includes his support.)
Rasmussen Reports	November 2, 2000	1,549	—	47%	45%	—	8%
Ethridge & Associates LLC	October 31, 2000	286	—	47%	44%	—	9%
Opinion Research Associates	October 29, 2000	700 (RV)	—	46%	46%	3%	5%
Mason-Dixon Polling & Strategy	October 28, 2000	625	—	45%	44%	4%	7%

== California ==
Poll source	Date(s)	Sample size	Margin of error	George W. Bush (R)	Al Gore (D)	Ralph Nader (G)	Other / undecided (Note: Calculated by taking the difference of 100% and all other listed candidates combined. For polls that do not report a figure for Nader, this includes his support.)
Zogby Analytics	November 5, 2000	596	—	45%	45%	8%	2%
Field Research Corp. (Field Poll)	November 3, 2000	924	—	41%	46%	4%	9%
Harris Insights & Analytics	November 3, 2000	25,017	—	43%	49%	6%	2%
Zogby Analytics	November 2, 2000	600	—	40%	48%	5%	7%
SurveyUSA	November 1, 2000	530	—	43%	49%	7%	1%
Research 2000	October 31, 2000	820	—	40%	47%	5%	8%
Field Research Corp. (Field Poll)	October 29, 2000	990	—	40%	47%	4%	9%
Rasmussen Reports	October 29, 2000	1,536	—	41%	44%	—	15%
SurveyUSA	October 25, 2000	530	—	43%	47%	7%	3%
Research 2000	October 24, 2000	822	—	39%	49%	5%	7%
Los Angeles Times	October 21, 2000	852	—	41%	48%	5%	6%

== Colorado ==
Poll source	Date(s)	Sample size	Margin of error	George W. Bush (R)	Al Gore (D)	Ralph Nader (G)	Other / undecided (Note: Calculated by taking the difference of 100% and all other listed candidates combined. For polls that do not report a figure for Nader, this includes his support.)
Harris Insights & Analytics	November 3, 2000	3,697	—	48%	43%	6%	3%
Ciruli Associates	November 2, 2000	400	—	47%	38%	5%	10%
Ciruli Associates	October 29, 2000	400	—	46%	37%	4%	13%
Ciruli Associates	October 25, 2000	400	—	47%	37%	3%	13%
SurveyUSA	October 23, 2000	500	—	52%	39%	—	9%

== Connecticut ==
Poll source	Date(s)	Sample size	Margin of error	George W. Bush (R)	Al Gore (D)	Ralph Nader (G)	Other / undecided (Note: Calculated by taking the difference of 100% and all other candidates combined.)
Harris Insights & Analytics	November 3, 2000	2,525	—	40%	51%	7%	2%

== Delaware ==
Poll source	Date(s)	Sample size	Margin of error	George W. Bush (R)	Al Gore (D)	Ralph Nader (G)	Other / undecided (Note: Calculated by taking the difference of 100% and all other listed candidates combined. For polls that do not report a figure for Nader, this includes his support.)
Mason-Dixon Polling & Strategy	November 1, 2000	625	—	46%	42%	4%	8%
Rasmussen Reports	October 30, 2000	776	—	43%	44%	—	13%
SurveyUSA	October 24, 2000	500	—	45%	49%	—	6%

== Florida ==
Poll source	Date(s)	Sample size	Margin of error	George W. Bush (R)	Al Gore (D)	Ralph Nader (G)	Other / undecided (Note: Calculated by taking the difference of 100% and all other listed candidates combined. For polls that do not report a figure for Nader, this includes his support.)
SurveyUSA	November 5, 2000	500	—	45%	50%	—	5%
Zogby Analytics	November 5, 2000	593	—	46%	48%	6%	0%
Harris Insights & Analytics	November 3, 2000	17,033	—	46%	49%	3%	2%
Zogby Analytics	November 2, 2000	600	—	45%	46%	5%	4%
Rasmussen Reports	November 1, 2000	577	—	47%	45%	—	8%
SurveyUSA	November 1, 2000	500	—	45%	50%	—	5%
American Research Group	October 31, 2000	600	—	44%	49%	2%	5%
Mason-Dixon Polling & Strategy	October 31, 2000	812	—	46%	44%	2%	8%
Zogby Analytics	October 30, 2000	600	—	41%	48%	5%	6%
Los Angeles Times	October 28, 2000	401	—	48%	44%	2%	6%
Zogby Analytics	October 27, 2000	600	—	42%	49%	3%	6%
Rasmussen Reports	October 25, 2000	864	—	46%	45%	—	9%
CBS News/The New York Times	October 23, 2000	514 (Note: Average of multiple versions or turnout models listed in the poll.)	—	45%	48.5%	3%	3.5%
American Research Group	October 22, 2000	600	—	45%	49%	2%	4%
Fleming & Associates	October 20, 2000	606	—	46%	41%	4%	9%
McLaughlin & Associates (R) (Note: Poll conducted for Bill McCollum.)	October 17, 2000	600	—	44%	43%	3%	10%

== Georgia ==
Poll source	Date(s)	Sample size	Margin of error	George W. Bush (R)	Al Gore (D)	Ralph Nader (G)	Other / undecided (Note: Calculated by taking the difference of 100% and all other listed candidates combined. For polls that do not report a figure for Nader, this includes his support.)
Harris Insights & Analytics	November 3, 2000	6,987	—	51%	43%	—	6%
Marketing Workshop	October 29, 2000	512	—	53%	37%	2%	8%
Rasmussen Reports	October 22, 2000	1,029	—	50%	40%	—	10%

== Hawaii ==
Poll source	Date(s)	Sample size	Margin of error	George W. Bush (R)	Al Gore (D)	Ralph Nader (G)	Other / undecided (Note: Calculated by taking the difference of 100% and all other candidates combined.)
Harris Insights & Analytics	November 3, 2000	589	—	38%	53%	7%	2%
Ward Research	October 22, 2000	261	—	31%	50%	6%	13%

== Idaho ==
Poll source	Date(s)	Sample size	Margin of error	George W. Bush (R)	Al Gore (D)	Ralph Nader (G)	Other / undecided (Note: Calculated by taking the difference of 100% and all other listed candidates combined. For polls that do not report a figure for Nader, this includes his support.)
Harris Insights & Analytics	November 3, 2000	908	—	65%	27%	1%	7%
Mason-Dixon Polling & Strategy	October 26, 2000	633	—	56%	30%	4%	10%
Rasmussen Reports	October 21, 2000	890	—	62%	24%	—	14%

== Illinois ==
Poll source	Date(s)	Sample size	Margin of error	George W. Bush (R)	Al Gore (D)	Ralph Nader (G)	Other / undecided (Note: Calculated by taking the difference of 100% and all other listed candidates combined. For polls that do not report a figure for Nader, this includes his support.)
Zogby Analytics	November 5, 2000	584	—	43%	50%	7%	0%
Harris Insights & Analytics	November 3, 2000	8,957	—	45%	51%	1%	3%
Zogby Analytics	November 2, 2000	600	—	40%	49%	5%	6%
Research 2000	November 1, 2000	602	—	42%	48%	4%	6%
Zogby Analytics	October 30, 2000	600	—	42%	46%	4%	8%
Mason-Dixon Polling & Strategy	October 29, 2000	625	—	43%	46%	3%	8%
Zogby Analytics	October 27, 2000	600	—	41%	48%	3%	8%
Zogby Analytics	October 27, 2000	600	—	39%	46%	6%	9%
Opinion Dynamics	October 26, 2000	600	—	45%	42%	4%	9%
Rasmussen Reports	October 23, 2000	880	—	40%	44%	—	16%
Richard Day Research	October 23, 2000	801	—	38%	43%	4%	15%
Market Shares Corp.	October 22, 2000	899	—	35%	45%	4%	16%
KRC Research	October 17, 2000	600	—	43%	45%	4%	8%
Research 2000	October 17, 2000	601	—	40%	47%	3%	10%

== Indiana ==
Poll source	Date(s)	Sample size	Margin of error	George W. Bush (R)	Al Gore (D)	Ralph Nader (G)	Other / undecided (Note: Calculated by taking the difference of 100% and all other listed candidates combined. For polls that do not report a figure for Nader, this includes his support.)
Harris Insights & Analytics	November 3, 2000	5,599	—	56%	39%	1%	4%
SurveyUSA	November 2, 2000	500	—	60%	32%	—	8%
Rasmussen Reports	October 30, 2000	723	—	52%	33%	—	15%
Market Shares Corp.	October 27, 2000	600	—	53%	30%	—	17%

== Iowa ==
Poll source	Date(s)	Sample size	Margin of error	George W. Bush (R)	Al Gore (D)	Ralph Nader (G)	Other / undecided (Note: Calculated by taking the difference of 100% and all other listed candidates combined. For polls that do not report a figure for Nader, this includes his support.)
Harris Insights & Analytics	November 3, 2000	2,478	—	44%	50%	4%	2%
Rasmussen Reports	November 2, 2000	1,000	—	46%	42%	—	12%
Research 2000	November 1, 2000	603	—	43%	44%	4%	9%
Selzer & Co.	November 1, 2000	805	—	42%	44%	3%	11%
PSI	October 31, 2000	500	—	44%	41%	—	15%
SurveyUSA	October 30, 2000	500	—	46%	46%	—	8%

== Kansas ==
Poll source	Date(s)	Sample size	Margin of error	George W. Bush (R)	Al Gore (D)	Ralph Nader (G)	Other / undecided (Note: Calculated by taking the difference of 100% and all other candidates combined.)
Harris Insights & Analytics	November 3, 2000	2,543	—	55%	38%	4%	3%

== Kentucky ==
Poll source	Date(s)	Sample size	Margin of error	George W. Bush (R)	Al Gore (D)	Ralph Nader (G)	Other / undecided (Note: Calculated by taking the difference of 100% and all other listed candidates combined. For polls that do not report a figure for Nader, this includes his support.)
Harris Insights & Analytics	November 3, 2000	3,318	—	54%	42%	4%	0%
Mason-Dixon Polling & Strategy	November 3, 2000	625	—	51%	41%	—	8%
SurveyUSA	November 2, 2000	500	—	58%	40%	—	2%
Magellan Strategies	October 28, 2000	681	—	55%	40%	1%	4%
Rasmussen Reports	October 21, 2000	944	—	48%	39%	—	13%

== Louisiana ==
Poll source	Date(s)	Sample size	Margin of error	George W. Bush (R)	Al Gore (D)	Ralph Nader (G)	Other / undecided (Note: Calculated by taking the difference of 100% and all other listed candidates combined. For polls that do not report a figure for Nader, this includes his support.)
Mason-Dixon Polling & Strategy	October 21, 2000	624	—	52%	39%	1%	8%
Southeastern Louisiana University Social Science Research Center	October 21, 2000	660	—	46%	38%	2%	14%
Rasmussen Reports	October 19, 2000	733	—	48%	41%	—	11%
University of New Orleans Survey Research Center	October 19, 2000	461 (Note: Average of multiple versions or turnout models listed in the poll.)	—	48%	35%	2%	15%

== Maine ==
Poll source	Date(s)	Sample size	Margin of error	George W. Bush (R)	Al Gore (D)	Ralph Nader (G)	Other / undecided (Note: Calculated by taking the difference of 100% and all other listed candidates combined. For polls that do not report a figure for Nader, this includes his support.)
Harris Insights & Analytics	November 3, 2000	1,485	—	42%	50%	6%	2%
RKM Research and Communications Inc.	October 29, 2000	602	—	42%	42%	4%	12%
Market Decisions Research	October 24, 2000	824	—	41%	42%	5%	12%
Myers Research & Strategic Services	October 22, 2000	400	—	34%	42%	5%	19%
Pan Atlantic Research	October 22, 2000	400	—	36%	47%	—	17%
Rasmussen Reports	October 22, 2000	1,548	—	43%	39%	—	18%

== Maryland ==
Poll source	Date(s)	Sample size	Margin of error	George W. Bush (R)	Al Gore (D)	Ralph Nader (G)	Other / undecided (Note: Calculated by taking the difference of 100% and all other listed candidates combined. For polls that do not report a figure for Nader, this includes his support.)
Harris Insights & Analytics	November 3, 2000	5,230	—	39%	56%	4%	1%
Gonzales Research & Marketing Strategies Inc.	October 27, 2000	627	—	38%	52%	4%	6%
Mason-Dixon Polling & Strategy	October 26, 2000	625	—	40%	48%	5%	7%
Rasmussen Reports	October 26, 2000	696	—	40%	47%	—	13%
SurveyUSA	October 22, 2000	500	—	41%	52%	—	7%

== Massachusetts ==
Poll source	Date(s)	Sample size	Margin of error	George W. Bush (R)	Al Gore (D)	Ralph Nader (G)	Other / undecided (Note: Calculated by taking the difference of 100% and all other candidates combined.)
Harris Insights & Analytics	November 3, 2000	5,141	—	32%	58%	8%	2%
University of Massachusetts Department of Political Science	October 27, 2000	401 (RV)	—	30%	52%	7%	11%
KRC Research	October 25, 2000	400	—	28%	54%	7%	11%
RKM Research and Communications Inc.	October 25, 2000	400	—	28%	52%	5%	15%

== Michigan ==
Poll source	Date(s)	Sample size	Margin of error	George W. Bush (R)	Al Gore (D)	Ralph Nader (G)	Other / undecided (Note: Calculated by taking the difference of 100% and all other listed candidates combined. For polls that do not report a figure for Nader, this includes his support.)
Zogby Analytics	November 5, 2000	593	—	45%	51%	4%	0%
Rasmussen Reports	November 4, 2000	787	—	45%	44%	—	11%
SurveyUSA	November 4, 2000	600	—	48%	46%	4%	2%
Harris Insights & Analytics	November 3, 2000	8,757	—	45%	50%	3%	2%
EPIC-MRA	November 2, 2000	500	—	44%	45%	—	11%
Zogby Analytics	November 2, 2000	600	—	40%	49%	5%	6%
Mitchell Research & Communications	November 1, 2000	800	—	41%	46%	3%	10%
Research 2000	November 1, 2000	602	—	41%	46%	4%	9%
American Research Group	October 31, 2000	600	—	44%	48%	3%	5%
Zogby Analytics	October 30, 2000	600	—	41%	50%	3%	6%
Rasmussen Reports	October 29, 2000	956	—	43%	43%	—	14%
SurveyUSA	October 29, 2000	600	—	45%	49%	—	6%
Los Angeles Times	October 28, 2000	401	—	44%	48%	3%	5%
Zogby Analytics	October 27, 2000	603	—	45%	46%	3%	6%
Opinion Dynamics	October 26, 2000	600	—	40%	43%	4%	13%
Marketing Resource Group (MRG)	October 25, 2000	500	—	45%	39%	5%	11%
EPIC-MRA	October 24, 2000	600	—	44%	42%	3%	11%
Lake Research Partners/The Tarrance Group	October 24, 2000	400	—	42%	43%	5%	10%
Mitchell Research & Communications	October 24, 2000	600	—	42%	42%	3%	13%
Hill Research Consultants (R) (Note: Poll conducted for an unspecified Republican sponsor.)	October 23, 2000	550	—	42%	41%	—	17%
American Research Group	October 22, 2000	600	—	43%	46%	4%	7%
SurveyUSA	October 22, 2000	600	—	46%	47%	—	7%
EPIC-MRA	October 18, 2000	600	—	43%	43%	4%	10%
Rasmussen Reports	October 18, 2000	626	—	43%	43%	—	14%

== Minnesota ==
Poll source	Date(s)	Sample size	Margin of error	George W. Bush (R)	Al Gore (D)	Ralph Nader (G)	Other / undecided (Note: Calculated by taking the difference of 100% and all other candidates combined.)
Harris Insights & Analytics	November 3, 2000	3,796	—	43%	46%	8%	3%
Minneapolis Star Tribune	November 2, 2000	1,015	—	37%	47%	8%	8%
Mason-Dixon Polling & Strategy	October 27, 2000	625	—	41%	44%	8%	7%
St. Cloud State University	October 19, 2000	514	—	41%	38%	10%	11%

== Mississippi ==
Poll source	Date(s)	Sample size	Margin of error	George W. Bush (R)	Al Gore (D)	Other / undecided (Note: Calculated by taking the difference of 100% and all other candidates combined.)
Mason-Dixon Polling & Strategy	November 3, 2000	625	—	52%	41%	7%
Ethridge & Associates LLC	October 31, 2000	341	—	55%	33%	12%

== Missouri ==
Poll source	Date(s)	Sample size	Margin of error	George W. Bush (R)	Al Gore (D)	Ralph Nader (G)	Other / undecided (Note: Calculated by taking the difference of 100% and all other listed candidates combined. For polls that do not report a figure for Nader, this includes his support.)
Zogby Analytics	November 5, 2000	597	—	48%	47%	3%	2%
American Research Group	November 3, 2000	600	—	45%	46%	4%	5%
Harris Insights & Analytics	November 3, 2000	5,833	—	49%	46%	2%	3%
Zogby Analytics	November 2, 2000	600	—	47%	45%	4%	4%
Research 2000	November 1, 2000	600	—	45%	45%	4%	6%
Zogby Analytics	October 30, 2000	600	—	46%	43%	4%	7%
Rasmussen Reports	October 29, 2000	1,243	—	47%	42%	—	11%
Zogby Analytics	October 27, 2000	600	—	47%	45%	3%	5%
Zogby Analytics	October 25, 2000	603	—	44%	46%	4%	6%
Mason-Dixon Polling & Strategy	October 24, 2000	625	—	45%	44%	4%	7%
Rasmussen Reports	October 23, 2000	1,072	—	46%	42%	—	12%

== Montana ==
Poll source	Date(s)	Sample size	Margin of error	George W. Bush (R)	Al Gore (D)	Ralph Nader (G)	Other / undecided (Note: Calculated by taking the difference of 100% and all other listed candidates combined. For polls that do not report a figure for Nader, this includes his support.)
Mason-Dixon Polling & Strategy	October 24, 2000	628	—	49%	37%	5%	9%
Montana State University Billings Mountain States Poll	October 21, 2000	403 (Note: Average of multiple versions or turnout models listed in the poll.)	—	53%	32%	5%	10%
Rasmussen Reports	October 19, 2000	968	—	56%	28%	—	16%

== Nebraska ==
Poll source	Date(s)	Sample size	Margin of error	George W. Bush (R)	Al Gore (D)	Ralph Nader (G)	Other / undecided (Note: Calculated by taking the difference of 100% and all other candidates combined.)
Harris Insights & Analytics	November 3, 2000	1,481	—	57%	38%	4%	1%
RKM Research and Communications Inc.	October 26, 2000	1,007 (RV)	—	56%	31%	2%	11%

== Nevada ==
Poll source	Date(s)	Sample size	Margin of error	George W. Bush (R)	Al Gore (D)	Ralph Nader (G)	Other / undecided (Note: Calculated by taking the difference of 100% and all other listed candidates combined. For polls that do not report a figure for Nader, this includes his support.)
Harris Insights & Analytics	November 3, 2000	1,835	—	48%	45%	4%	3%
SurveyUSA	November 1, 2000	500	—	49%	44%	—	7%
Mason-Dixon Polling & Strategy	October 27, 2000	625	—	47%	43%	2%	8%
Rasmussen Reports	October 23, 2000	817	—	49%	37%	—	14%

== New Hampshire ==
Poll source	Date(s)	Sample size	Margin of error	George W. Bush (R)	Al Gore (D)	Ralph Nader (G)	Other / undecided (Note: Calculated by taking the difference of 100% and all other listed candidates combined. For polls that do not report a figure for Nader, this includes his support.)
American Research Group	November 3, 2000	600	—	48%	38%	9%	5%
Harris Insights & Analytics	November 3, 2000	1,400	—	45%	47%	7%	1%
University of New Hampshire Survey Center	November 3, 2000	801	—	45%	39%	5%	11%
American Research Group	November 1, 2000	600	—	45%	40%	5%	10%
RKM Research and Communications Inc.	October 31, 2000	487	—	42%	43%	3%	12%
Research 2000	October 31, 2000	600	—	42%	46%	2%	10%
Franklin Pierce University Marlin Fitzwater Center for Communication	October 24, 2000	885 (RV)	—	40%	43%	5%	12%
Rasmussen Reports	October 22, 2000	1,338	—	46%	38%	—	16%
Research 2000	October 17, 2000	603	—	41%	44%	1%	14%

== New Jersey ==
Poll source	Date(s)	Sample size	Margin of error	George W. Bush (R)	Al Gore (D)	Ralph Nader (G)	Other / undecided (Note: Calculated by taking the difference of 100% and all other listed candidates combined. For polls that do not report a figure for Nader, this includes his support.)
Rasmussen Reports	November 5, 2000	637	—	40%	46%	—	14%
Harris Insights & Analytics	November 3, 2000	7,217	—	40%	54%	5%	1%
Monmouth University Poilling Institute	November 3, 2000	843	—	34%	47%	6%	13%
Quinnipiac University Polling Institute	November 1–5, 2000	770 LV	±3.4%	41%	49%	4%	6%
Rasmussen Reports	October 30, 2000	594	—	39%	45%	—	16%
Monmouth University Poilling Institute	October 27, 2000	575	—	36%	41%	—	23%
Quinnipiac University Polling Institute	October 24–30, 2000	793 LV	±3.5%	38%	50%	5%	7%
Rutgers University Eagleton Center for Public Interest Polling	October 25, 2000	432	—	35%	47%	5%	13%
SurveyUSA	October 25, 2000	500	—	45%	49%	—	6%
Quinnipiac University Polling Institute	October 18–23, 2000	909 LV	±3.3%	41%	47%	4%	9%
The New York Times	October 12–15, 2000	908 RV	±3%	34%	49%	8%	9%
Quinnipiac University Polling Institute	September 26–October 1, 2000	820 LV	±3.4%	38%	54%	–	8%
Quinnipiac University Polling Institute	September 26–October 1, 2000	820 LV	±3.4%	36%	50%	6%	7%
Quinnipiac University Polling Institute	September 26–October 1, 2000	1,045 RV	±3.0%	36%	53%	–	11%
Quinnipiac University Polling Institute	September 26–October 1, 2000	1,045 RV	±3.0%	35%	49%	6%	10%
Quinnipiac University Polling Institute	August 18–22, 2000	802 RV	±3.5%	38%	52%	–	10%
Quinnipiac University Polling Institute	August 18–22, 2000	802 RV	±3.5%	37%	49%	4%	10%
Quinnipiac University Polling Institute	July 19–24, 2000	910 RV	±3.3%	41%	46%	–	14%
Quinnipiac University Polling Institute	July 19–24, 2000	910 RV	±3.3%	38%	42%	7%	13%
Quinnipiac University Polling Institute	June 20–26, 2000	1,004 RV	±3.1%	40%	45%	–	15%
Quinnipiac University Polling Institute	June 20–26, 2000	1,004 RV	±3.1%	37%	41%	7%	15%
Quinnipiac University Polling Institute	March 21–27, 2000	1,177 RV	±2.9%	37%	50%	–	14%
Quinnipiac University Polling Institute	March 21–27, 2000	1,177 RV	±2.9%	35%	48%	–	18% (Note: Includes 6% for Pat Buchanan.)
Quinnipiac University Polling Institute	February 16–21, 2000	1,109 RV	±2.9%	41%	47%	–	12%
Quinnipiac University Polling Institute	July 13–20, 1999	1,082 RV	±3.0%	51%	40%		10%
Quinnipiac University Polling Institute	March 23–29, 1999	984 RV	±3.1%	47%	40%	–	13%
Quinnipiac University Polling Institute	February 3–8, 1999	926 RV	±3.2%	46%	41%	–	11%

Hypothetical polling

with Al Gore

Poll source	Date(s) administered	Sample size	Margin of error	Al Gore (D)	Elizabeth Dole (R)	John McCain (R)	Other	Undecided
Quinnipiac University Polling Institute	February 3–8, 1999	926 RV	±3.2%	42%	43%	–	2%	13%
Quinnipiac University Polling Institute	March 23–29, 1999	984 RV	±3.1%	41%	42%	–	17%	
Quinnipiac University Polling Institute	July 13–20, 1999	1,082 RV	±3.0%	46%	41%	–	2%	11%
Quinnipiac University Polling Institute	February 16–21, 2000	1,109 RV	±2.9%	38%	–	51%	2%	11%

with Bill Bradley

Poll source	Date(s) administered	Sample size	Margin of error	Bill Bradley (D)	George W. Bush (R)	Elizabeth Dole (R)	John McCain (R)	Other	Undecided
Quinnipiac University Polling Institute	February 3–8, 1999	926 RV	±3.2%	55%	32%	–	–	2%	11%
Quinnipiac University Polling Institute	February 3–8, 1999	926 RV	±3.2%	56%	–	32%	–	2%	10%
Quinnipiac University Polling Institute	March 23–29, 1999	984 RV	±3.1%	53%	35%	–	–	12%	
Quinnipiac University Polling Institute	March 23–29, 1999	984 RV	±3.1%	59%	–	28%	–	13%	
Quinnipiac University Polling Institute	July 13–20, 1999	1,082 RV	±3.0%	53%	38%	–	–	1%	8%
Quinnipiac University Polling Institute	July 13–20, 1999	1,082 RV	±3.0%	62%	–	28%	–	2%	8%
Quinnipiac University Polling Institute	February 16–21, 2000	1,109 RV	±2.9%	60%	32%	–	–	1%	8%
Quinnipiac University Polling Institute	February 16–21, 2000	1,109 RV	±2.9%	49%	–	–	38%	1%	12%

== New Mexico ==
Poll source	Date(s)	Sample size	Margin of error	George W. Bush (R)	Al Gore (D)	Ralph Nader (G)	Other / undecided (Note: Calculated by taking the difference of 100% and all other candidates combined.)
Harris Insights & Analytics	November 3, 2000	1,657	—	44%	49%	6%	1%
Mason-Dixon Polling & Strategy	November 2, 2000	625	—	45%	45%	4%	6%
Research & Polling Inc.	November 1, 2000	769	—	44%	41%	5%	10%

== New York ==
Poll source	Date(s)	Sample size	Margin of error	George W. Bush (R)	Al Gore (D)	Ralph Nader (G)	Other / undecided (Note: Calculated by taking the difference of 100% and all other listed candidates combined. For polls that do not report a figure for Nader, this includes his support.)
Zogby Analytics	November 5, 2000	689		37%	56%	6%	1%
Marist College	November 4, 2000	580	—	37%	55%	4%	4%
Rasmussen Reports	November 4, 2000	680	—	36%	50%	—	14%
Harris Insights & Analytics	November 3, 2000	13,590	—	38%	53%	6%	3%
Quinnipiac University Polling Institute	November 3, 2000	979	—	34%	55%	6%	5%
Blum & Weprin Associates	November 2, 2000	851	—	33%	53%	5%	9%
Zogby Analytics	November 2, 2000	700	—	38%	52%	7%	3%
Blum & Weprin Associates	November 1, 2000	883	—	31%	55%	3%	11%
SurveyUSA	November 1, 2000	500	—	36%	55%	—	9%
Marist College	October 30, 2000	516	—	36%	50%	4%	10%
Princeton Survey Research Associates International	October 30, 2000	844	—	38%	51%	6%	5%
Zogby Analytics	October 30, 2000	700	—	36%	51%	5%	8%
CBS News/The New York Times	October 27, 2000	871	—	35%	55%	7%	3%
Quinnipiac University Polling Institute	October 27, 2000	600 (Note: Sample size unavailable; 600 is a default estimate used in the source dataset.)	—	33%	54%	5%	8%
Zogby Analytics	October 27, 2000	700	—	36%	50%	7%	7%
Blum & Weprin Associates	October 24, 2000	844	—	31%	55%	4%	10%
SurveyUSA	October 24, 2000	500	—	39%	54%	—	7%
Rasmussen Reports	October 22, 2000	781	—	37%	48%	—	15%
Quinnipiac University Polling Institute	September 28, 2000	—	—	34%	54%	6%	6%
Quinnipiac University Polling Institute	September 13, 2000	—	—	29%	56%	6%	9%
Quinnipiac University Polling Institute	August 10, 2000	—	—	38%	42%	6%	14%
Quinnipiac University Polling Institute	July 13, 2000	—	—	35%	45%	7%	13%
Quinnipiac University Polling Institute	May 2, 2000	—	—	34%	50%	—	16%
Quinnipiac University Polling Institute	April 6, 2000	—	—	34%	52%	—	14%
Quinnipiac University Polling Institute	March 1, 2000	—	—	36%	53%	—	11%
Quinnipiac University Polling Institute	February 10, 2000	—	—	37%	53%	—	10%
Quinnipiac University Polling Institute	January 19, 2000	—	—	39%	47%	—	12%
Quinnipiac University Polling Institute	December 14, 1999	—	—	39%	47%	—	12%
Quinnipiac University Polling Institute	November 11, 1999	—	—	43%	47%	—	10%
Quinnipiac University Polling Institute	October 3, 1999	—	—	41%	43%	—	16%
Quinnipiac University Polling Institute	September 15, 1999	—	—	43%	46%	—	11%
Quinnipiac University Polling Institute	August 2, 1999	—	—	43%	45%	—	12%
Quinnipiac University Polling Institute	July 1, 1999	—	—	45%	44%	—	11%
Quinnipiac University Polling Institute	March 24, 1999	—	—	42%	47%	—	11%
Quinnipiac University Polling Institute	February 24, 1999	—	—	40%	49%	—	11%

Hypothetical polling

with Bill Bradley

Poll source	Date(s)	Bill Bradley (D)	George W. Bush (R)	Elizabeth Dole (R)	John McCain (R)	Pat Buchanan (Rf)	Ralph Nader (R)
Quinnipiac University Polling Institute	February 24, 1999	41%	38%	—	—	—	—
Quinnipiac University Polling Institute	February 24, 1999	46%	—	34%	—	—	—
Quinnipiac University Polling Institute	March 24, 1999	47%	42%	—	—	—	—
Quinnipiac University Polling Institute	March 24, 1999	47%	—	35%	—	—	—
Quinnipiac University Polling Institute	July 1, 1999	44%	45%	—	—	—	—
Quinnipiac University Polling Institute	July 1, 1999	50%		35%	—	—	—
Quinnipiac University Polling Institute	August 2, 1999	45%	43%	—	—	—	—
Quinnipiac University Polling Institute	September 15, 1999	46%	43%	—	—	—	—
Quinnipiac University Polling Institute	October 3, 1999	43%	41%	—	—	—	—
Quinnipiac University Polling Institute	November 11, 1999	47%	43%	—	—	—	—
		55%		—	23%	—	—
Quinnipiac University Polling Institute	December 14, 1999	47%	39%	—		—	—
		48%		—	29%	—	—
Quinnipiac University Polling Institute	January 19, 2000	47%	39%	—		—	—
		49%		—	29%	—	—
Quinnipiac University Polling Institute	February 10, 2000	53%	37%	—		—	—
		43%		—	40%	—	—
Quinnipiac University Polling Institute	March 1, 2000	53%	36%	—		—	—
		39%		—	44%	—	—
Quinnipiac University Polling Institute	April 6, 2000	52%	34%	—		4%	—
Quinnipiac University Polling Institute	May 2, 2000	50%	34%	—	—	4%	—
Quinnipiac University Polling Institute	July 13, 2000	45%	35%	—	—	2%	7%
Quinnipiac University Polling Institute	August 10, 2000	42%	38%	—	—	1%	6%
Quinnipiac University Polling Institute	September 13, 2000	56%	29%	—	—	2%	6%
Quinnipiac University Polling Institute	September 28, 2000	54%	34%	—	—	1%	6%
Quinnipiac University Polling Institute	November 6, 2000	55%	34%	—	—	1%	6%

with Al Gore

Poll source	Date(s)	Al Gore (D)	Elizabeth Dole (R)	John McCain (R)
Quinnipiac University Polling Institute	February 24, 1999	50%	37%	—
Quinnipiac University Polling Institute	March 24, 1999	49%	38%	—
Quinnipiac University Polling Institute	July 1, 1999	50%	37%	—
Quinnipiac University Polling Institute	November 11, 1999	49%	—	35%
Quinnipiac University Polling Institute	December 14, 1999	45%	—	39%
Quinnipiac University Polling Institute	January 19, 2000	47%	—	38%
Quinnipiac University Polling Institute	February 10, 2000	46%	—	42%
Quinnipiac University Polling Institute	March 1, 2000	44%	—	43%

== North Carolina ==
Poll source	Date(s)	Sample size	Margin of error	George W. Bush (R)	Al Gore (D)	Other / undecided (Note: Calculated by taking the difference of 100% and all other candidates combined.)
SurveyUSA	November 4, 2000	500	—	56%	39%	5%
Harris Insights & Analytics	November 3, 2000	6,704	—	51%	46%	3%
Rasmussen Reports	November 1, 2000	1,163	—	50%	40%	10%
Research 2000	October 31, 2000	405	—	52%	42%	6%
Mason-Dixon Polling & Strategy	October 29, 2000	625	—	48%	41%	11%
SurveyUSA	October 29, 2000	500	—	54%	41%	5%

== North Dakota ==
Poll source	Date(s)	Sample size	Margin of error	George W. Bush (R)	Al Gore (D)	Other / undecided (Note: Calculated by taking the difference of 100% and all other candidates combined.)
Rasmussen Reports	October 21, 2000	1,258	—	49%	34%	17%

== Ohio ==
Poll source	Date(s)	Sample size	Margin of error	George W. Bush (R)	Al Gore (D)	Ralph Nader (G)	Other / undecided (Note: Calculated by taking the difference of 100% and all other listed candidates combined. For polls that do not report a figure for Nader, this includes his support.)
Zogby Analytics	November 5, 2000	589	—	48%	45%	5%	2%
Harris Insights & Analytics	November 3, 2000	10,975	—	49%	46%	4%	1%
University of Cincinnati (Ohio Poll)	November 3, 2000	1,273	—	53%	43%	3%	1%
Mason-Dixon Polling & Strategy	November 2, 2000	625	—	46%	40%	5%	9%
Zogby Analytics	November 2, 2000	600	—	51%	41%	3%	5%
SurveyUSA	November 1, 2000	500	—	50%	43%	—	7%
Columbus Dispatch	October 31, 2000	2,050	—	52%	42%	3%	3%
Zogby Analytics	October 30, 2000	600	—	48%	40%	4%	8%
Zogby Analytics	October 27, 2000	600	—	49%	43%	3%	5%
Rasmussen Reports	October 23, 2000	929	—	48%	39%	—	13%
University of Cincinnati (Ohio Poll)	October 22, 2000	666	—	50%	42%	4%	4%
Mason-Dixon Polling & Strategy	October 19, 2000	625	—	45%	41%	4%	10%

== Oklahoma ==
Poll source	Date(s)	Sample size	Margin of error	George W. Bush (R)	Al Gore (D)	Other / undecided (Note: Calculated by taking the difference of 100% and all other candidates combined.)
Harris Insights & Analytics	November 3, 2000	3,206	—	59%	37%	4%
Mason-Dixon Polling & Strategy	November 3, 2000	625	—	54%	39%	7%

== Oregon ==
Poll source	Date(s)	Sample size	Margin of error	George W. Bush (R)	Al Gore (D)	Ralph Nader (G)	Other / undecided (Note: Calculated by taking the difference of 100% and all other listed candidates combined. For polls that do not report a figure for Nader, this includes his support.)
Harris Insights & Analytics	November 3, 2000	3,376	—	42%	49%	7%	2%
SurveyUSA	October 30, 2000	500	—	50%	42%	—	8%
DHM Research	October 27, 2000	600	—	44%	45%	4%	7%
SurveyUSA	October 26, 2000	500	—	48%	42%	—	10%
American Research Group	October 22, 2000	600	—	45%	41%	10%	4%
Rasmussen Reports	October 21, 2000	1,352	—	43%	38%	—	19%

== Pennsylvania ==
Poll source	Date(s)	Sample size	Margin of error	George W. Bush (R)	Al Gore (D)	Ralph Nader (G)	Other / undecided (Note: Calculated by taking the difference of 100% and all other listed candidates combined. For polls that do not report a figure for Nader, this includes his support.)
Rasmussen Reports	November 5, 2000	1,091	—	47%	43%	—	10%
Zogby Analytics	November 4, 2000	600	—	42%	50%	6%	2%
Harris Insights & Analytics	November 2, 2000	11,301	—	45%	50%	4%	1%
Mason-Dixon Polling & Strategy	November 2, 2000	625	—	45%	48%	—	7%
Rasmussen Reports	November 2, 2000	644	—	47%	42%	—	11%
Decision Forecasting	November 1, 2000	1,032	—	43%	47%	4%	6%
SurveyUSA	November 1, 2000	800	—	48%	48.01%	—	3.99%
Zogby Analytics	November 1, 2000	600	—	42%	43%	8%	7%
American Research Group	October 31, 2000	600	—	42%	48%	3%	7%
SurveyUSA	October 31, 2000	800	—	48%	47%	—	5%
Rasmussen Reports	October 29, 2000	967	—	45%	42%	—	13%
Zogby Analytics	October 29, 2000	600	—	42%	46%	5%	7%
Los Angeles Times	October 28, 2000	420	—	47%	45%	2%	6%
Millersville University Center for Politics and Public Affairs	October 28, 2000	550	—	43%	42%	5%	10%
Opinion Dynamics	October 26, 2000	600	—	39%	42%	7%	12%
Zogby Analytics	October 26, 2000	600	—	47%	40%	3%	10%
Lake Research Partners/The Tarrance Group	October 24, 2000	400	—	40%	45%	5%	10%
American Research Group	October 22, 2000	600	—	43%	48%	2%	7%
Public Opinion Strategies (R) (Note: Poll conducted for an unspecified Republican sponsor.)	October 22, 2000	800	—	45%	43%	3%	9%
West Chester University	October 21, 2000	600 (Note: Sample size unavailable; 600 is a default estimate used in the source dataset.)	—	33%	44%	1%	22%
Rasmussen Reports	October 18, 2000	1,043	—	43%	42%	—	15%
Lincoln Institute	October 17, 2000	728	—	42%	42%	4%	12%
SurveyUSA	October 17, 2000	800	—	48%	47%	—	5%

== Rhode Island ==
Poll source	Date(s)	Sample size	Margin of error	George W. Bush (R)	Al Gore (D)	Ralph Nader (G)	Other / undecided (Note: Calculated by taking the difference of 100% and all other listed candidates combined. For polls that do not report a figure for Nader, this includes his support.)
SurveyUSA	October 29, 2000	500	—	31%	57%	—	12%
Brown University A. Alfred Taubman Center for American Politics and Policy	October 22, 2000	370	—	29%	47%	8%	16%
Rasmussen Reports	October 19, 2000	802	—	30%	49%	—	21%

== South Carolina ==
Poll source	Date(s)	Sample size	Margin of error	George W. Bush (R)	Al Gore (D)	Ralph Nader (G)	Other / undecided (Note: Calculated by taking the difference of 100% and all other listed candidates combined. For polls that do not report a figure for Nader, this includes his support.)
Mason-Dixon Polling & Strategy	October 29, 2000	625	—	53%	38%	2%	7%
SurveyUSA	October 22, 2000	500	—	54%	41%	—	5%

== South Dakota ==
Poll source	Date(s)	Sample size	Margin of error	George W. Bush (R)	Al Gore (D)	Other / undecided (Note: Calculated by taking the difference of 100% and all other candidates combined.)
Jim Meader (KELOLAND-TV)	October 23, 2000	506 (RV)	—	51%	33%	16%

== Tennessee ==
Poll source	Date(s)	Sample size	Margin of error	George W. Bush (R)	Al Gore (D)	Ralph Nader (G)	Other / undecided (Note: Calculated by taking the difference of 100% and all other listed candidates combined. For polls that do not report a figure for Nader, this includes his support.)
Zogby Analytics	November 5, 2000	490	—	52%	45%	2%	1%
Harris Insights & Analytics	November 3, 2000	5,187	—	49%	47%	2%	2%
Mason-Dixon Polling & Strategy	November 3, 2000	625	—	49%	45%	—	6%
Zogby Analytics	November 2, 2000	500	—	46%	46%	4%	4%
American Research Group	October 31, 2000	600	—	43%	49%	2%	6%
Ethridge & Associates LLC	October 31, 2000	550	—	47%	44%	—	9%
Zogby Analytics	October 30, 2000	500	—	48%	45%	2%	5%
Multi-Quest International	October 29, 2000	403 (RV)	—	43%	45%	—	12%
Rasmussen Reports	October 28, 2000	722	—	45%	44%	—	11%
Zogby Analytics	October 27, 2000	500	—	51%	44%	2%	3%
Rasmussen Reports	October 21, 2000	839	—	47%	43%	—	10%

== Texas ==
Poll source	Date(s)	Sample size	Margin of error	George W. Bush (R)	Al Gore (D)	Ralph Nader (G)	Other / undecided (Note: Calculated by taking the difference of 100% and all other listed candidates combined. For polls that do not report a figure for Nader, this includes his support.)
Harris Insights & Analytics	November 3, 2000	17,936	—	57%	39%	3%	1%
Mason-Dixon Polling & Strategy	November 3, 2000	625	—	64%	30%	—	6%
Scripps Howard	November 3, 2000	800	—	57%	27%	—	16%
Scripps Howard	October 20, 2000	1,000 (RV)	—	57%	27%	3%	13%

== Utah ==
Poll source	Date(s)	Sample size	Margin of error	George W. Bush (R)	Al Gore (D)	Ralph Nader (G)	Other / undecided (Note: Calculated by taking the difference of 100% and all other listed candidates combined. For polls that do not report a figure for Nader, this includes his support.)
Harris Insights & Analytics	November 3, 2000	1,641	—	65%	25%	6%	4%
Valley Research	November 3, 2000	1,300	—	60%	24%	4%	12%
Rasmussen Reports	October 24, 2000	918	—	62%	24%	—	14%

== Vermont ==
Poll source	Date(s)	Sample size	Margin of error	George W. Bush (R)	Al Gore (D)	Ralph Nader (G)	Other / undecided (Note: Calculated by taking the difference of 100% and all other listed candidates combined. For polls that do not report a figure for Nader, this includes his support.)
Rasmussen Reports	October 26, 2000	1,000	—	39%	45%	—	16%
Research 2000	October 24, 2000	400	—	36%	52%	5%	7%
Mason-Dixon Polling & Strategy	October 19, 2000	628	—	38%	47%	6%	9%

== Virginia ==
Poll source	Date(s)	Sample size	Margin of error	George W. Bush (R)	Al Gore (D)	Ralph Nader (G)	Other / undecided (Note: Calculated by taking the difference of 100% and all other listed candidates combined. For polls that do not report a figure for Nader, this includes his support.)
SurveyUSA	November 4, 2000	500	—	53%	42%	—	5%
Harris Insights & Analytics	November 3, 2000	7,488	—	51%	45%	3%	1%
Mason-Dixon Polling & Strategy	October 31, 2000	625	—	49%	41%	3%	7%
Rasmussen Reports	October 30, 2000	897	—	50%	40%	—	10%
Richmond Times-Dispatch	October 30, 2000	735	—	46%	40%	—	14%
SurveyUSA	October 30, 2000	500	—	52%	43%	—	5%
Mason-Dixon Polling & Strategy	October 25, 2000	627	—	48%	41%	3%	8%
ABC News/The Washington Post	October 24, 2000	1,009	—	49%	45%	3%	3%
Rasmussen Reports	October 24, 2000	1,100	—	50%	38%	—	12%
Virginia Commonwealth University L. Douglas Wilder School of Government and Public Affairs	October 21, 2000	596	—	54%	40%	—	6%

== Washington ==
Poll source	Date(s)	Sample size	Margin of error	George W. Bush (R)	Al Gore (D)	Ralph Nader (G)	Other / undecided (Note: Calculated by taking the difference of 100% and all other listed candidates combined. For polls that do not report a figure for Nader, this includes his support.)
Rasmussen Reports	November 5, 2000	909	—	44%	43%	—	13%
Zogby Analytics	November 5, 2000	504	—	43%	50%	5%	2%
Harris Insights & Analytics	November 3, 2000	6,549	—	47%	46%	5%	2%
Zogby Analytics	November 2, 2000	500	—	43%	46%	7%	4%
SurveyUSA	November 1, 2000	500	—	44%	46%	8%	2%
Zogby Analytics	October 30, 2000	500	—	43%	45%	6%	6%
Zogby Analytics	October 27, 2000	500	—	43%	46%	6%	5%
EMC Research (D) (Note: Poll conducted for an unspecified Democratic sponsor.)	October 21, 2000	500	—	38%	44%	4%	14%
Elway Research	October 19, 2000	400 (RV)	—	37%	46%	3%	14%

== West Virginia ==
Poll source	Date(s)	Sample size	Margin of error	George W. Bush (R)	Al Gore (D)	Ralph Nader (G)	Other / undecided (Note: Calculated by taking the difference of 100% and all other listed candidates combined. For polls that do not report a figure for Nader, this includes his support.)
Harris Insights & Analytics	November 3, 2000	1,689	—	50%	46%	3%	1%
Rasmussen Reports	November 2, 2000	1,066	—	45%	42%	—	13%
West Virginia Research Center	October 25, 2000	536	—	41%	39%	1%	19%
RMS Research	October 22, 2000	605	—	46%	36%	—	18%
Ohio State University	October 18, 2000	645 (RV)	—	49%	39%	3%	9%
Rasmussen Reports	October 18, 2000	1,036	—	44%	42%	—	14%

== Wisconsin ==
Poll source	Date(s)	Sample size	Margin of error	George W. Bush (R)	Al Gore (D)	Ralph Nader (G)	Other / undecided (Note: Calculated by taking the difference of 100% and all other listed candidates combined. For polls that do not report a figure for Nader, this includes his support.)
Market Shares Corp.	November 5, 2000	400	—	44%	39%	6%	11%
Rasmussen Reports	November 5, 2000	1,000	—	47%	43%	—	10%
Zogby Analytics	November 5, 2000	492	—	46%	46%	6%	2%
Harris Insights & Analytics	November 3, 2000	5,168	—	47%	47%	5%	1%
Zogby Analytics	November 2, 2000	500	—	46%	45%	5%	4%
Research 2000	November 1, 2000	619	—	40%	46%	4%	10%
Zogby Analytics	October 30, 2000	500	—	42%	45%	5%	8%
Market Shares Corp.	October 27, 2000	500	—	46%	39%	5%	10%
Zogby Analytics	October 27, 2000	500	—	40%	49%	6%	5%
Lake Research Partners/The Tarrance Group	October 24, 2000	400	—	42%	43%	6%	9%
St. Norbert College Strategic Research Institute	October 21, 2000	413	—	39%	46%	5%	10%
Harris Insights & Analytics	October 20, 2000	587	—	49%	40%	5%	6%

== See also ==
- Nationwide opinion polling for the 2000 United States presidential election
- 2000 United States elections
  - 2000 United States gubernatorial elections
  - 2000 United States House of Representatives elections
  - 2000 United States Senate elections
