= Nationwide opinion polling for the 2000 United States presidential election =

This is a list of nationwide public opinion polls that were conducted relating to the general election for the 2000 United States presidential election. Those named in the polls were declared candidates or had received media speculation about their possible candidacy.

== National poll results ==
National poll results among declared candidates.

=== Al Gore vs. George W. Bush vs. Ralph Nader ===
Poll source	Date(s)	Sample size	Margin of error	George W. Bush (R)	Al Gore (D)	Ralph Nader (G)	Other / undecided (Note: Calculated by taking the difference of 100% and all other listed candidates combined. For polls that do not report a figure for Nader, this includes his support.)
Gallup	November 6, 2000	2,350 (Note: Average of multiple versions or turnout models listed in the poll.)	—	47.5%	45.5%	4%	3%
Lake Research Partners/The Tarrance Group	November 6, 2000	1,000	—	48%	43%	3.75%	5.25%
CBS News/The New York Times	November 5, 2000	1,091	—	44%	45%	4%	7%
CBS News/The New York Times	November 5, 2000	1,091	—	44%	45%	4%	7%
Rasmussen Reports	November 5, 2000	3,750	—	49%	40%	—	11%
TIPP Insights	November 5, 2000	1,292	—	47.9%	46%	4%	2.1%
Zogby Analytics	November 5, 2000	1,200	—	46%	48%	5%	1%
Zogby Analytics	November 5, 2000	1,200	—	46%	48%	5%	1%
ABC News/The Washington Post	November 4, 2000	1,801	—	49%	46%	3%	2%
CBS News/The New York Times	November 4, 2000	937 (Note: Sample size unavailable; 600 is a default estimate used in the source dataset.)	—	47.5%	43%	5%	4.5%
Harris Insights & Analytics	November 4, 2000	1,348	—	47%	47%	5%	1%
Hart Research Associates/Public Opinion Strategies	November 4, 2000	1,026	—	47%	44%	3%	6%
Pew Research Center	November 4, 2000	1,301	—	47%	45%	4%	4%
Polling Company/Global Strategy Group	November 4, 2000	1,253	—	45%	42%	4%	9%
ABC News/The Washington Post	November 3, 2000	1,741	—	50%	46%	3%	1%
CBS News/The New York Times	November 3, 2000	1,158	—	48.5%	43.5%	5%	3%
Gallup	November 3, 2000	2,733	—	48%	43%	4%	5%
Hart Research Associates/Public Opinion Strategies	November 3, 2000	751	—	47%	44%	4%	5%
Pew Research Center	November 3, 2000	1,307	—	46%	43%	3%	8%
Polling Company/Global Strategy Group	November 3, 2000	1,253	—	45%	42%	4%	9%
SSRS	November 3, 2000	1,103	—	46%	44%	7%	3%
ABC News/The Washington Post	November 2, 2000	1,519	—	49%	46%	3%	2%
CBS News/The New York Times	November 2, 2000	825	—	46%	44%	4%	6%
CBS News/The New York Times	November 2, 2000	825	—	46%	44%	4%	6%
Harris Insights & Analytics	November 2, 2000	134,000	—	47%	46%	4%	3%
Marist College	November 2, 2000	623	—	49%	44%	2%	5%
Opinion Dynamics	November 2, 2000	1,000	—	43%	43%	3%	11%
TIPP Insights	November 2, 2000	883	—	48%	41%	3%	8%
Zogby Analytics	November 2, 2000	1,200	—	46%	43%	5.5%	5.5%
Lake Research Partners/The Tarrance Group	November 1, 2000	1,000	—	46%	37%	5%	12%
Polling Company/Global Strategy Group	November 1, 2000	1,000	—	47%	40%	4%	9%
Princeton Survey Research Associates International	November 1, 2000	808	—	45%	43%	5%	7%
Rasmussen Reports	November 1, 2000	3,750	—	46%	43%	—	11%
ABC News/The Washington Post	October 31, 2000	1,032	—	50%	45.5%	3%	1.5%
GQR (D) (Note: Poll conducted for an unspecified Democratic sponsor.)	October 31, 2000	1,016	—	46.5%	46.5%	5%	2%
Gallup	October 31, 2000	2,123	—	47%	43%	4%	6%
ABC News/The Washington Post	October 30, 2000	1,081	—	49.5%	46%	3%	1.5%
CBS News/The New York Times	October 30, 2000	783	—	46.5%	46%	4%	3.5%
TIPP Insights	October 30, 2000	1,016	—	47%	43%	3%	7%
Zogby Analytics	October 30, 2000	1,200	—	46%	41%	4%	9%
ABC News/The Washington Post	October 29, 2000	1,020	—	49%	46.5%	3%	1.5%
Rasmussen Reports	October 29, 2000	3,750	—	40%	47%	—	13%
ABC News/The Washington Post	October 28, 2000	998	—	47.5%	48%	3%	1.5%
Gallup	October 28, 2000	2,207	—	47%	44%	2%	7%
ABC News/The Washington Post	October 27, 2000	1,432	—	48%	47.5%	4%	0.5%
Lake Research Partners/The Tarrance Group	October 27, 2000	1,000	—	44%	39%	4%	13%
Pew Research Center	October 27, 2000	1,062	—	47%	43%	3%	7%
SSRS	October 27, 2000	1,103	—	43%	40%	9%	8%
Princeton Survey Research Associates International	October 26, 2000	818	—	49%	41%	4%	6%
Princeton Survey Research Associates International	October 26, 2000	1,113	—	47%	45%	5%	3%
Yankelovich Partners Inc.	October 26, 2000	838	—	49.5%	44.5%	3%	3%
Zogby Analytics	October 26, 2000	1,200	—	43.5%	44%	4.5%	8%
ABC News/The Washington Post	October 25, 2000	1,027	—	49%	45%	4%	2%
GQR (D)	October 25, 2000	998	—	45%	47%	5%	3%
Gallup	October 25, 2000	851	—	52%	39%	4%	5%
Rasmussen Reports	October 25, 2000	3,750	—	42%	46%	—	12%
ABC News/The Washington Post	October 23, 2000	1,037	—	48.5%	47%	3%	1.5%
Harris Insights & Analytics	October 23, 2000	813	—	48%	43%	5%	4%
ABC News/The Washington Post	October 22, 2000	1,011	—	48%	47.5%	3%	1.5%
ABC News/The Washington Post	October 22, 2000	1,070	—	47%	47.5%	4%	1.5%
Gallup	October 22, 2000	752	—	45%	46%	3%	6%
Rasmussen Reports	October 22, 2000	3,750	—	41%	47%	—	12%
Wirthlin Worldwide	October 22, 2000	751	—	47%	43%	4%	6%
Zogby Analytics	October 22, 2000	1,200	—	44%	42%	5%	9%
Lake Research Partners/The Tarrance Group	October 21, 2000	1,000	—	45%	39%	5%	11%
TIPP Insights	October 21, 2000	829	—	44%	42%	5%	9%
American Viewpoint	October 20, 2000	800	—	42%	40%	5%	13%
CBS News/The New York Times	October 20, 2000	713	—	47%	45.5%	4%	3.5%
Pew Research Center	October 20, 2000	663	—	45%	45%	4%	6%
SSRS	October 20, 2000	653	—	43%	41%	8%	8%
ABC News/The Washington Post	October 19, 2000	1,020	—	47%	45%	3%	5%
ABC News/The Washington Post	October 19, 2000	1,020	—	48.5%	46%	3%	2.5%
GQR (D)	October 19, 2000	1,009	—	45%	47.5%	5%	2.5%
GQR (D)	October 19, 2000	832	—	45%	46%	4%	5%
Gallup	October 19, 2000	718	—	51%	40%	4%	5%
Opinion Dynamics	October 19, 2000	900	—	45%	42%	4%	9%
Princeton Survey Research Associates International	October 19, 2000	800	—	48%	41%	5%	6%
Zogby Analytics	October 19, 2000	1,200	—	45%	44%	4%	7%
Hart Research Associates/Public Opinion Strategies	October 18, 2000	600	—	45%	43%	3%	9%
Rasmussen Reports	October 18, 2000	3,750	—	41%	46%	—	13%

== Limitations ==
While national polls give important signals on the views of the electorate, the winner of the election is determined by the United States Electoral College, so the level of support for each candidate in each state is important. This is gauged by state-by-state polling.

Poll results can be affected by methodology, especially in how they predict who will vote in the next election, and re-weighting answers to compensate for slightly non-random samples.

== See also ==
- Statewide opinion polling for the 2000 United States presidential election
- 2000 United States elections
  - 2000 United States gubernatorial elections
  - 2000 United States House of Representatives elections
  - 2000 United States Senate elections
