= 2022 Colorado Secretary of State election =

- November 8, 2022
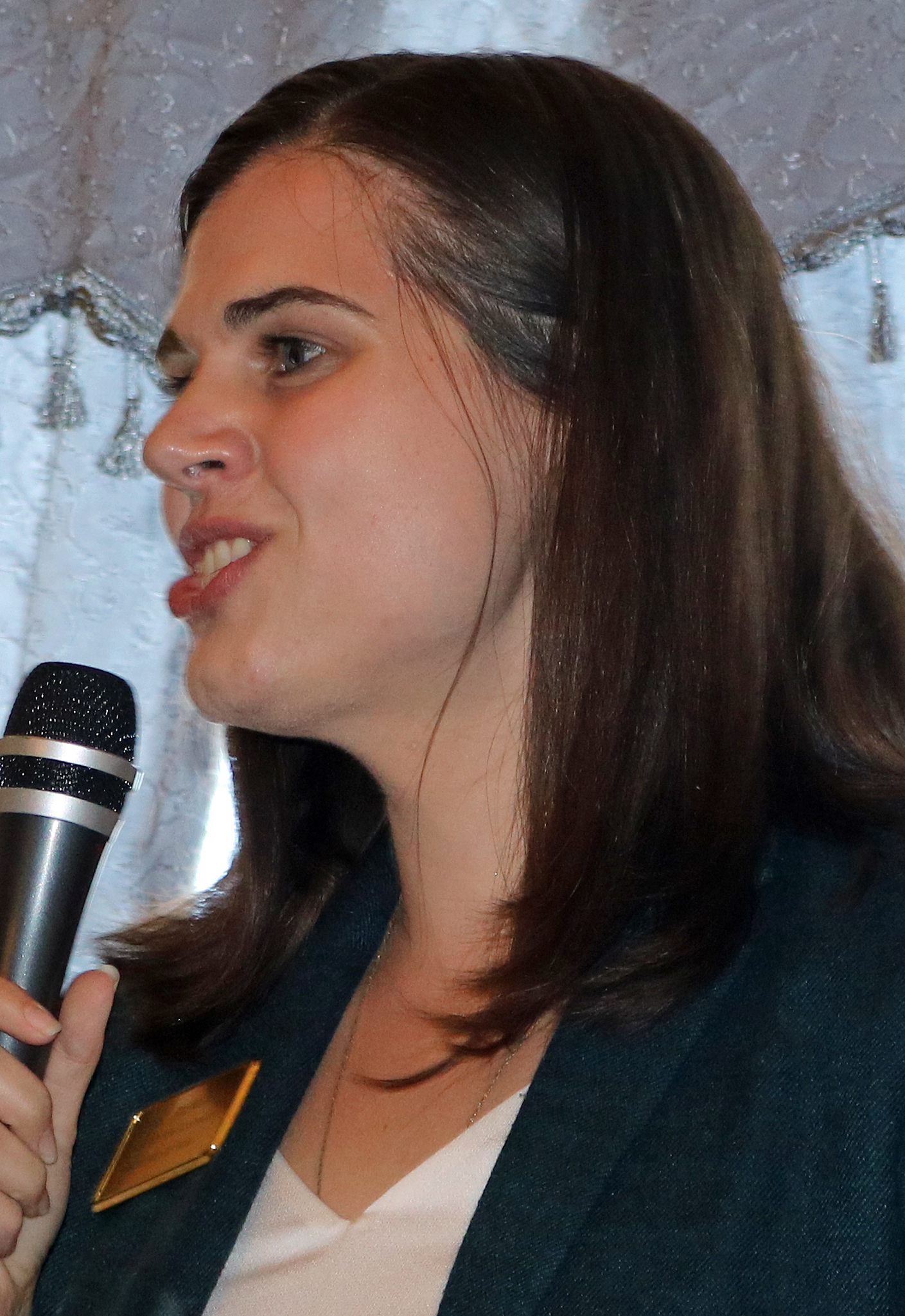

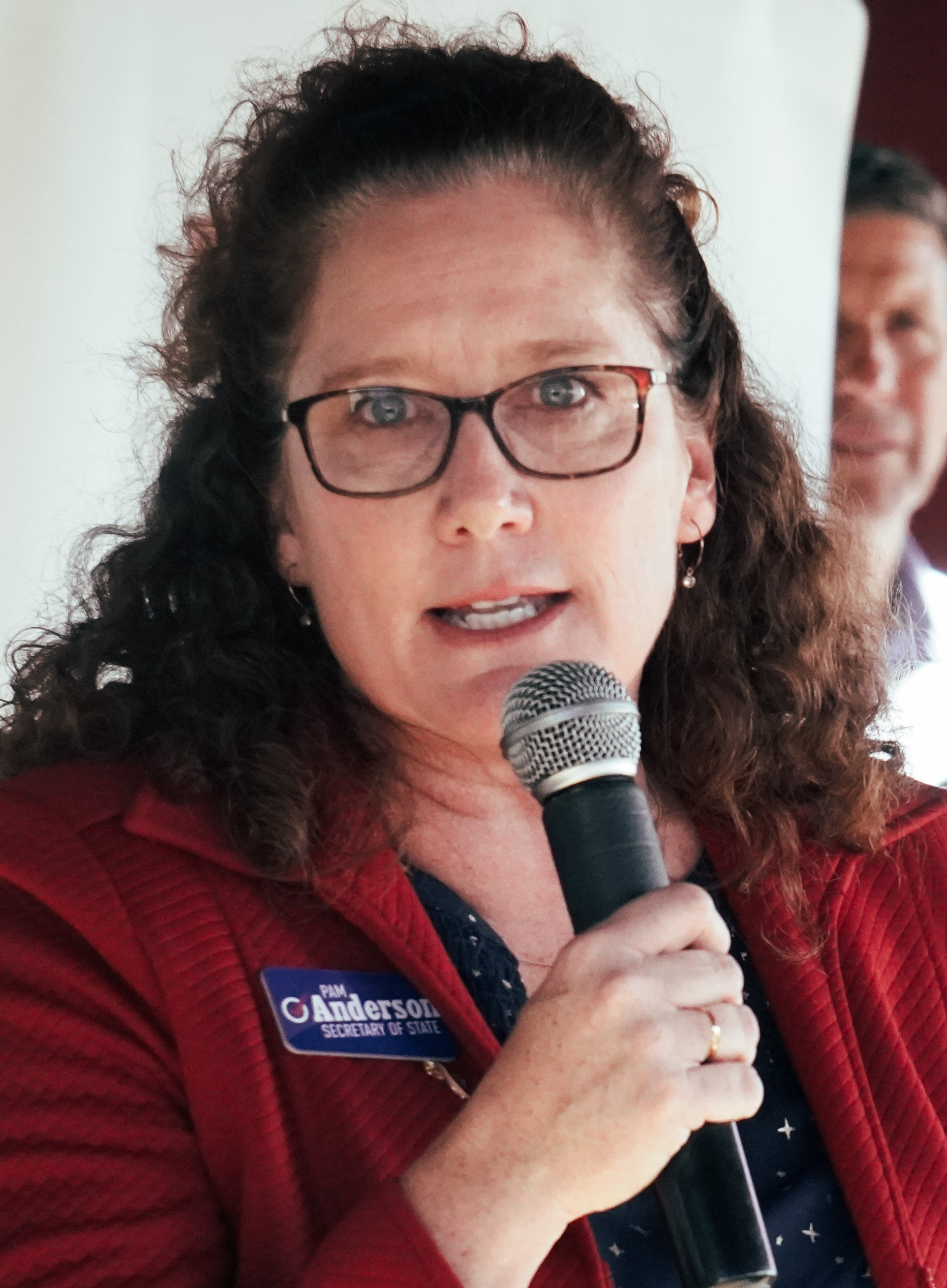
| Nominee | Jena Griswold | Pam Anderson |
| Party | Democratic | Republican |
| Popular vote | 1,369,040 | 1,045,582 |
| Percentage | 55.10% | 42.08% |
- Griswold: 40–50% 50–60% 60–70% 70–80% 80–90% >90% Anderson: 40–50% 50–60% 60–70% 70–80% 80–90% >90% Tie: 40–50% 50% No votes
Secretary of State before election
Jena Griswold
Democratic
Elected Secretary of State
Jena Griswold
Democratic

The 2022 Colorado Secretary of State election took place on November 8, 2022, to elect the Secretary of State of Colorado. Incumbent Democrat Jena Griswold won re-election to a second term, improving on her 2018 results.

== Democratic primary ==
=== Candidates ===
==== Nominee ====
- Jena Griswold, incumbent secretary of state

=== Endorsements ===
Jena Griswold

Organizations

- Democracy for America
- EMILY's List
- End Citizens United
- Everytown for Gun Safety
- Human Rights Campaign
- Let America Vote

=== Results ===
Democratic primary results
| Party | Candidate | Votes | % |
|---|---|---|---|
| Democratic | Jena Griswold (incumbent) | 510,462 | 100.0% |
| Total votes | | 510,462 | 100.0% |

== Republican primary ==
The Republican primary was held on June 28, 2022.

=== Candidates ===
==== Nominee ====
- Pam Anderson, former Jefferson County clerk (2007–2015)

==== Eliminated in primary ====
- Mike O'Donnell, former head of Colorado Lending Source
- Tina Peters, Mesa County clerk

==== Withdrew ====
- David Winney, marine veteran (endorsed Tina Peters, running for El Paso County county commissioner)

==== Declined ====
- Rose Pugliese, former Mesa County commissioner

=== Endorsements ===
Pam Anderson

Federal officials

- Hank Brown, former U.S. Senator from Colorado (1991–1997)
- Jason R. Dunn, former United States Attorney for the District of Colorado (2018–2021)
- Troy Eid, former United States Attorney for the District of Colorado (2006–2009)
- Scott McInnis, member of the Mesa County commission (2015–) and former U.S. Representative from Colorado's 3rd congressional district (1993–2005)

State legislators

- Vicki Alger, former state representative
- Don Ament, former state senator
- Rob Fairbank, former state representative
- Tim Foster, former state representative
- Bob Gardner, state senator from the 12th district (2017–)
- Larry Liston, state senator from the 10th district (2021–)
- Chris Paulson, former state representative
- Jerry Sonnenberg, state senator from the 1st district (2015–)
- Nancy Spence, former state senator from the 27th district (2005–2013)
- Ron Teck, former state senator
- Rob Witwer, former state representative (2005–2009)

Local officials

- Cami Bremer, member of the El Paso County board of commissioners
- Mike Coffman, mayor of Aurora (2019–), former U.S. Representative from Colorado's 6th congressional district (2009–2019) and former Secretary of State of Colorado (2007–2009)
- Cody Davis, Mesa County commissioner
- Scott Doyle, former Larimer County clerk
- Ann Eddins, former Delta County clerk
- Kevin Grantham, member of the Fremont County board of commissioners
- Danielle Jurinsky, member of the Aurora city council
- Ted Mink, former Jefferson County sheriff
- Steve Moreno, Weld County commissioner
- Janet Rowland, Mesa County commissioner
- Jeff Schrader, Jefferson County sheriff
- John Suthers, mayor of Colorado Springs (2015–) and former Colorado Attorney General (2005–2015)
- Wayne W. Williams, member of the Colorado Springs city council (2019–) and former Secretary of State of Colorado (2015–2019)

Newspapers and other media

- Colorado Springs Gazette

Individuals

- Norma Anderson, former majority leader of the Colorado Senate (candidate's mother-in-law)
- Donetta Davidson, former chair of the Election Assistance Commission and former Secretary of State of Colorado (1999–2005)
- Mark Hillman, former Colorado State Treasurer (2005–2006)

=== Forum ===
2022 Colorado Secretary of State republican primary candidate forum
| No. | Date | Host | Moderator | Link | Republican | Republican | Republican |
| Key: P Participant A Absent N Not invited I Invited W Withdrawn | | | | | | | |
| Key: P Participant A Absent N Not invited I Invited W Withdrawn | | | | | Pam Anderson | Mike O'Donnell | Tina Peters |
|---|---|---|---|---|---|---|---|
| 1 | May 12, 2022 | Foothills Republicans Club | | | P | P | P |

=== Results ===
Results by county: Anderson: 30–40%; 40–50%; 50–60%; Peters: 30–40%; 40–50%; O'Donnell: 30–40%; 40–50%

Republican primary results
| Party | Candidate | Votes | % |
|---|---|---|---|
| Republican | Pam Anderson | 268,638 | 43.06% |
| Republican | Tina Peters | 180,059 | 28.86% |
| Republican | Mike O'Donnell | 175,158 | 28.08% |
| Total votes | | 623,855 | 100.0% |

== General election ==
=== Debate ===
2022 Colorado Secretary of State debate
| No. | Date | Host | Moderator | Link | Democratic | Republican |
| Key: P Participant A Absent N Not invited I Invited W Withdrawn | | | | | | |
| Key: P Participant A Absent N Not invited I Invited W Withdrawn | | | | | Jena Griswold | Pam Anderson |
|---|---|---|---|---|---|---|
| 1 | Oct. 24, 2022 | KUSA | Kyle Clark; Marshall Zelinger | | P | P |

=== Predictions ===
| Source | Ranking | As of |
|---|---|---|
| Sabato's Crystal Ball | Leans D | November 3, 2022 |
| Elections Daily | Leans D | November 7, 2022 |

=== Post-primary endorsements ===
Jena Griswold (D)

Newspapers

- Sentinel Colorado
Pam Anderson (R)

Newspapers and other media

- The Denver Post

Individuals

- Gigi Dennis, former Secretary of State (2005–2007)

=== Polling ===
| Poll source | Date(s) administered | Sample size (Note: Key: A – all adults RV – registered voters LV – likely voters V – unclear) | Margin of error | Jena Griswold (D) | Pam Anderson (R) | Other | Undecided |
|---|---|---|---|---|---|---|---|
| CU Boulder/YouGov | October 11–19, 2022 | 709 (LV) | ± 4.4% | 54% | 43% | 3% (Note: "Other" with 3%) | – |
| Global Strategy Group (D) (Note: This poll was sponsored by ProgressNow Colorado, a liberal nonprofit organization.) | October 6–11, 2022 | 800 (LV) | ± 3.5% | 46% | 36% | 8% (Note: Rutledge (L) with 4%; Campbell (ACP) with 3%; Swing (U) with 1%) | 10% |
| Global Strategy Group (D) | October 6–11, 2022 | 800 (LV) | ± 3.5% | 50% | 41% | – | 9% |

=== Results ===
2022 Colorado Secretary of State election
| Party | Candidate | Votes | % | ±% |
|---|---|---|---|---|
| Democratic | Jena Griswold (incumbent) | 1,369,040 | 55.10% | +2.40% |
| Republican | Pam Anderson | 1,045,582 | 42.08% | −2.61% |
| Libertarian | Bennett Rutledge | 36,485 | 1.47% | N/A |
| American Constitution | Amanda Campbell | 17,602 | 0.71% | −1.37% |
| Unity | Gary Swing | 11,458 | 0.46% | N/A |
| Approval Voting | Jan Kok | 4,591 | 0.18% | −0.35% |
| Total votes | | 2,484,758 | 100.0% | |
| Democratic hold | | | | |

==== By county ====
| County | Jenna Griswold Democratic | | Pam Anderson Republican | | Various candidates Other parties | |
| County | # | % | # | % | # | % |
|---|---|---|---|---|---|---|
| Adams | 93,937 | 56.41% | 67,217 | 40.36% | 5,371 | 3.24% |
| Alamosa | 2,843 | 48.38% | 2,826 | 48.09% | 208 | 3.54% |
| Arapahoe | 151,301 | 59.33% | 96,977 | 38.03% | 6,724 | 2.62% |
| Archuleta | 3,288 | 42.95% | 4,065 | 53.10% | 303 | 3.96% |
| Baca | 353 | 20.40% | 1,286 | 74.34% | 91 | 5.26% |
| Bent | 572 | 62.86% | 1,129 | 62.86% | 95 | 5.29% |
| Boulder | 125,266 | 76.71% | 34,571 | 21.17% | 3,458 | 2.12% |
| Broomfield | 23,007 | 62.16% | 13,139 | 35.50% | 866 | 2.34% |
| Chaffee | 6,391 | 55.32% | 4,825 | 41.76% | 337 | 2.92% |
| Cheyenne | 117 | 12.83% | 772 | 84.65% | 23 | 2.53% |
| Clear Creek | 2,884 | 56.83% | 2,029 | 39.98% | 162 | 3.19% |
| Conejos | 1,556 | 45.87% | 1,726 | 50.88% | 110 | 3.24% |
| Costilla | 1,073 | 64.91% | 518 | 31.34% | 62 | 3.75% |
| Crowley | 386 | 28.34% | 914 | 67.11% | 62 | 4.56% |
| Custer | 1,040 | 31.42% | 2,154 | 65.08% | 116 | 3.50% |
| Delta | 5,245 | 33.06% | 10,096 | 63.64% | 522 | 3.29% |
| Denver | 221,962 | 78.52% | 54,838 | 19.40% | 5,876 | 2.08% |
| Dolores | 319 | 25.00% | 881 | 69.04% | 76 | 5.94% |
| Douglas | 83,690 | 44.38% | 100,341 | 53.20% | 4,565 | 2.42% |
| Eagle | 13,541 | 61.97% | 7,763 | 35.53% | 546 | 2.51% |
| El Paso | 121,991 | 43.19% | 151,345 | 53.59% | 9,099 | 3.22% |
| Elbert | 3,817 | 23.55% | 11,876 | 73.29% | 512 | 3.16% |
| Fremont | 6,501 | 32.89% | 12,564 | 63.56% | 702 | 3.55% |
| Garfield | 12,506 | 51.55% | 10,969 | 45.21% | 785 | 3.23% |
| Gilpin | 1,862 | 54.96% | 1,421 | 41.94% | 105 | 3.10% |
| Grand | 3,822 | 48.43% | 3,814 | 48.33% | 256 | 3.25% |
| Gunnison | 5,768 | 64.00% | 2,966 | 32.91% | 279 | 3.10% |
| Hinsdale | 217 | 42.72% | 269 | 52.95% | 22 | 4.32% |
| Huerfano | 1,993 | 52.12% | 1,705 | 44.59% | 126 | 3.29% |
| Jackson | 142 | 21.16% | 499 | 74.37% | 30 | 4.47% |
| Jefferson | 169,953 | 57.13% | 119,457 | 40.15% | 8,084 | 2.72% |
| Kiowa | 104 | 13.94% | 611 | 81.90% | 31 | 4.16% |
| Kit Carson | 503 | 16.77% | 2,417 | 80.57% | 80 | 2.67% |
| La Plata | 16,599 | 57.53% | 11,352 | 39.52% | 901 | 3.13% |
| Lake | 1,746 | 59.31% | 1,073 | 36.45% | 125 | 4.25% |
| Larimer | 99,661 | 57.00% | 70,307 | 40.21% | 4,868 | 2.78% |
| Las Animas | 3,199 | 48.46% | 3,188 | 48.29% | 215 | 3.26% |
| Lincoln | 372 | 17.75% | 1,643 | 78.39% | 81 | 3.87% |
| Logan | 1,873 | 22.76% | 6,051 | 73.53% | 305 | 3.71% |
| Mesa | 28,625 | 39.34% | 41,415 | 56.92% | 2,721 | 3.74% |
| Mineral | 293 | 41.98% | 374 | 53.58% | 31 | 4.44% |
| Moffat | 1,016 | 19.16% | 4,094 | 77.22% | 192 | 3.62% |
| Montezuma | 4,742 | 38.93% | 6,957 | 57.11% | 482 | 3.96% |
| Montrose | 7,117 | 34.77% | 12,790 | 62.49% | 560 | 2.73% |
| Morgan | 2,651 | 26.20% | 7,100 | 70.17% | 368 | 3.63% |
| Otero | 2,938 | 40.72% | 4,048 | 56.10% | 230 | 3.20% |
| Ouray | 2,103 | 59.52% | 1,341 | 37.96% | 89 | 2.52% |
| Park | 4,193 | 42.04% | 5,374 | 53.89% | 406 | 4.07% |
| Phillips | 370 | 18.96% | 1,484 | 76.06% | 97 | 4.97% |
| Pitkin | 6,846 | 74.24% | 2,193 | 23.78% | 182 | 1.95% |
| Prowers | 1,132 | 26.76% | 2,918 | 68.98% | 180 | 4.25% |
| Pueblo | 35,097 | 52.46% | 29,636 | 44.29% | 2,174 | 3.25% |
| Rio Blanco | 492 | 16.43% | 2,399 | 80.13% | 103 | 3.42% |
| Rio Grande | 1,998 | 41.12% | 2,667 | 54.89% | 194 | 3.98% |
| Routt | 8,489 | 62.39% | 4,778 | 35.12% | 339 | 2.49% |
| Saguache | 1,516 | 55.31% | 1,089 | 39.73% | 136 | 4.96% |
| San Juan | 343 | 64.35% | 172 | 32.27% | 18 | 3.39% |
| San Miguel | 3,013 | 74.88% | 909 | 22.59% | 102 | 2.53% |
| Sedgwick | 285 | 25.00% | 820 | 71.93% | 35 | 3.07% |
| Summit | 9,342 | 67.42% | 4,087 | 29.50% | 427 | 3.08% |
| Teller | 4,408 | 32.68% | 8.642 | 64.06% | 440 | 3.26% |
| Washington | 326 | 13.62% | 1,979 | 82.70% | 88 | 3.67% |
| Weld | 49,625 | 38.93% | 73,602 | 57.75% | 4,230 | 3.31% |
| Yuma | 680 | 17.29% | 3,120 | 79.33% | 133 | 3.39% |
| Totals | 1,369,040 | 55.10% | 1,045,582 | 42.08% | 70,136 | 2.82% |

Counties that flipped from Democratic to Republican

- Conejos (largest city: Manassa)

Counties that flipped from Republican to Democratic

- Garfield (largest city: Rifle)
- Grand (largest city: Granby)

==== By congressional district ====
Griswold won five of eight congressional districts.

| District | Griswold | Anderson | Representative |
|---|---|---|---|
| 1st | 78% | 19% | Diana DeGette |
| 2nd | 69% | 29% | Joe Neguse |
| 3rd | 47% | 50% | Lauren Boebert |
| 4th | 39% | 58% | Ken Buck |
| 5th | 44% | 53% | Doug Lamborn |
| 6th | 59% | 39% | Jason Crow |
| 7th | 56% | 42% | Ed Perlmutter (117th Congress) |
| 7th | 56% | 42% | Brittany Pettersen (118th Congress) |
| 8th | 50% | 46% | Yadira Caraveo |

== Notes ==
Partisan clients
