= Technical Guidelines Development Committee =

The Technical Guidelines Development Committee (TGDC) of the National Institute of Standards and Technology supports the Election Assistance Commission in the United States by providing recommendations on voluntary standards and guidelines related to voting equipment and technologies.

== Charter and Membership ==
The Technical Guidelines Development Committee (TGDC) assists EAC in developing the Voluntary Voting System Guidelines. The chairperson of the TGDC is the director of the National Institute of Standards and Technology (NIST). The TGDC is composed of 14 other members appointed jointly by EAC and the director of NIST from various standards boards and for their technical and scientific expertise related to voting systems and equipment. NIST chairs and manages the TGDC, provides technical guidance in areas such as encryption, usability engineering and testing, and performs work to improve testing and conformity assessment programs for voting systems. As part of its development of new voting standards, NIST consults with TGDC subcommittees and holds regular subcommittee teleconferences and periodic TGDC public meetings. Teleconference audio archives, TGDC meetings, and TGDC meetings and presentations and related NIST work material are open to the public. The public may also view and submit comments and position statements to the TGDC. The TGDC Charter was renewed in 2021.

== History ==
While the Help America Vote Act required that the Election Assistance Commission "adopt voluntary guidance and recommdations relating to the implementation of ... voting system standards," by Jan. 1, 2004, delays in appointing commissioners and lack of funding delayed the first meeting of the TGDC until July 9, 2004.

Initial members of the committee, listed with the statutory constituencies represented, were:

- Hratch Semerjian, National Institute of Standards and Technology, chair
- Donetta Davidson, EAC Standards Board
- Alice Miller, EAC Standards Board
- Sharon Turner Buie, EAC Board of Advisors
- Hellen Purcell, EAC Board of Advisors
- James R. Harding, Architectural and Transportation Barriers Compliance Board
- James Elekes, Architectural and Transportation Barriers Compliance Board
- Ann Caidas, American National Standards Institute
- H. Stephen Berger, Institute of Electrical and Electronics Engineers
- Brittain Williams, National Association of State Election Directors
- Paul Craft, National Association of State Election Directors
- Ronald Rivest, Scientific and technical expert
- Daniel Schutzer, Scientific and technical expert
- Patrick Gannon, Scientific and technical expert
- Whitney Quesenbery, Scientific and technical expert
