= Voting technology in New York State =

In 2010, New York State became the last U.S. state to switch to electronic voting under the Help America Vote Act. In doing so, New York abandoned its Shoup lever machines which had been used since 1962 and were originally built by American Voting Machines Company in Jamestown, New York.

New York had a long established history with the lever machines going back to the patent for the lever machine by Alfred J. Gillespie and Standard Voting Machine Company of Rochester, New York, in the late 1890s. The device drew a privacy curtain around the voter and simultaneously unlocked the machine's levers for voting. In 1898, Gillespie and Jacob Myers formed the American Voting Machines Company.

New York had a long history of attempting to replace the machines, including New York City mayor Edward Koch urging they be replaced in 1985.

As of 2019, Dominion Voting Systems ImageCast was used in 52 of the state's 62 counties. The contracts were originally awarded to Sequoia Voting Systems but Dominion acquired the company in 2010. However, the machines in some of the state's largest cities such as New York City, Buffalo, New York and Albany, New York are the DS200 Ballot Scanner by Election Systems & Software (ES&S).

Dominion had sued the New York City Board of Elections to stop the award of the $70 million contract for to ES&S on the basis that the contract was not the lowest bidder. New York City ES&S's offering were easier to set up. Courts did not issue a stay in the case, noting that doing so would jeopardize the implementation of the vote in time for the election.

Both companies had problems in the implementation in the first year, with ES&S being criticized after it was revealed that poll workers were scanning the ballots with the ballot side visible to the public in the primary. Officials said they fixed the problem by training ballot workers. Dominion suffered a problem in the 1st Congressional District in the general election after the machines initially indicated that Tim Bishop had won by 3,500 votes but by the next night officials had declared his opponent Randy Altschuler the victor by 400 votes.

== See also ==
- Electronic voting in the United States
- Elections in New York State
