= Natalie Meyer =

American politician (1930–2021)

31st Secretary of State of Colorado
- In office January 11, 1983 – January 10, 1995
- Governor: Richard Lamm; Roy Romer
- Preceded by: Mary Estill Buchanan
- Succeeded by: Victoria Buckley

Personal details
- Born: May 20, 1930 Henderson, North Carolina
- Died: September 23, 2021 (aged 91) Denver, Colorado
- Party: Republican

Natalie Meyer (May 20, 1930 – September 23, 2021) was an American politician who served as the Secretary of State of Colorado from 1983 to 1995.

She died on September 23, 2021, in Denver, Colorado, at age 91.
