= Gracia Hillman =

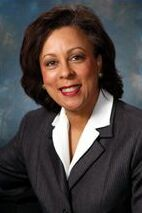
Gracia Hillman

Gracia M. Hillman is the former vice president for external affairs at Howard University in Washington, D.C. She grew up in New England, US. She is the daughter of the late Maria DaGraca Hillman and the late George Hillman. She has two brothers, George Hillman, Jr. and Robert W. Hillman. Hillman is of Cape Verdean descent.

She was formerly a commissioner of the Election Assistance Commission from 2003 to 2010. She was nominated by President George W. Bush on October 3, 2003 and confirmed by unanimous consent of the United States Senate on December 9, 2003 to serve a two-year term on the U.S. Election Assistance Commission (EAC). Hillman served as chair of the EAC in 2005, after serving as the agency's first vice chair in 2004. She resigned on December 10, 2010 after reaching the two-term limit for commissioners.

In her career, Hillman has handled both domestic and international issues. Her areas of expertise include nonprofit management, public policy and program development, political services, the interests and rights of women and minorities, community affairs and election-related matters, including voting rights.

She has traveled extensively throughout the United States meeting with national and local groups and businesses; speaking at conferences, conventions and other public forums; and conducting a variety of training and development seminars. Through her international work, Hillman traveled in Africa, Asia, the Caribbean and Europe. She conducted nonpartisan political training in Haiti and Kenya, and participated in UN sponsored conferences in Vienna, Beijing and at the United Nations in New York.

Prior to 2003, Hillman served as president and CEO of WorldSpace Foundation, a nonprofit organization that uses cutting-edge digital satellite technology to deliver audio and multimedia education programs to Africa and Asia. She also served the U.S. Department of State as its first senior coordinator for international women’s issues, where she was responsible for developing agency-wide strategies to ensure that U.S. foreign policy promoted and protected women’s rights. She was the State Department’s principal liaison with domestic nongovernmental organizations that are concerned with international women’s rights and the role of women in development. In 1995, Hillman was a member of the official U.S. delegation to the United Nations' Fourth World Conference on Women held in Beijing.

Her work experience includes having served as executive director of the League of Women Voters of the U.S., the Congressional Black Caucus Foundation and the National Coalition on Black Voter Participation, which sponsored the popular nonpartisan grassroots program, Operation Big Vote. She also held positions as executive consultant to the Council on Foundations and coordinator of the Voter Law Policy Project for the Joint Center for Political and Economic Studies.

Throughout the 1980s, Hillman championed many nonpartisan and bi-partisan efforts to ensure open access to the voting process for all citizens and the continued voting rights of minority Americans, including her work on the historic 25-year extension of the national Voting Rights Act. Her political experiences include paid and volunteer work on numerous local, statewide and national campaigns, including having served as a senior advisor with responsibility for Congressional and constituent relations for the 1988 Dukakis for President Campaign.

In 1990, Hillman was made the executive director of the League of Women Voters of the United States, the first Cape Verdean American to hold that position.

Hillman began her longtime commitment to public service and the nonprofit sector in 1970, when she worked for a community action program in her home state of Massachusetts. She also held management positions in Massachusetts State government. She has served on the boards and advisory committees of numerous local and national organizations concerned with public service, citizen participation and the development of public policy. Hillman was elected to the Common Cause national governing board in 2015.

Her writings include “Toward A More Perfect Union: The Congressional Black Caucus & Voting Rights,” and “E-Voting and Democracy in America.”

Hillman has one son from her former marriage and currently resides in Washington, D.C.
