= Voter Confidence and Increased Accessibility Act of 2003 =

The Voter Confidence and Increased Accessibility Act of 2003 (VCIAA) bill was introduced to the United States House of Representatives on May 22, 2003, as H.R. 2239 by Rush D. Holt, Jr. (D-NJ) and United States Senate on December 9, 2003, as S. 1980 by Bob Graham (D-FL). It is designed to "amend the Help America Vote Act (HAVA) of 2002 to require a voter-verified permanent record or hardcopy" in electronic voting systems.

== Provisions of the bill ==
=== Section 2 ===
This section titled "Extension Of Time Provided For States To Request Payments Under Title 1" extends the time permitted to request funds, for election administration and the replacement of old punched card voting or lever voting systems. The deadline is extended from "not later than 6 months after the date of the enactment of the act" (which would be April 29, 2003) to "not later than the Tuesday next after the first Monday in November 2003" (which would be November 11, 2003).

=== Section 4 ===
Section 4 is titled "Promoting Accuracy, Integrity, And Security Through Voter-Verified Permanent Record Or Hard Copy" and amends the "Voting Systems Standards" section of HAVA to allow voters to not only check their electronic vote but to also check the permanent paper record.

Where HAVA requires voting systems to include a "permanent paper record" available as "an official record" for any recount that might occur and to allow voters an "opportunity to change the ballot or correct any error before the permanent paper record is produced", VCIAA is specific that systems must include an "individual paper record" that is "the official record", "made available for inspection and verification by the voter at the time the vote is cast" and preserved for "later use in any manual recount".

This section also adds a new section to HAVA covering software and modems. This amendment requires that the software contained or used in voting systems is disclosed to the Federal Election Commission as source code and that the code can be made "available for inspection upon request to any citizen".

To address security concerns, Section 4 also disallows the use of any wireless communication devices at all in voting systems.

Disabled voters are also given the option of using an "interim paper system" with help from an aide as well as the "direct recording electronic voting system" outlined by HAVA. The deadline for requesting funds for such a system is moved from January 1, 2007, to January 1, 2006.
