= Title 11 of the Code of Federal Regulations =

U.S. federal rules and regulations on federal elections

CFR Title 11 – Federal Elections is one of 50 titles composing the United States Code of Federal Regulations (CFR) and contains the principal set of rules and regulations issued by federal agencies regarding federal elections. It is available in digital and printed form and can be referenced online using the Electronic Code of Federal Regulations (e-CFR).

== Structure ==
The table of contents, as reflected in the e-CFR updated February 24, 2014, is as follows:

Volume	Chapter	Parts	Regulatory Entity
1	I	1-9099	Federal Election Commission
	II	9400-9499	Election Assistance Commission
