= Certification of voting machines =

Various governments require a certification of voting machines.

In the United States there is only a voluntary federal certification for voting machines and each state has ultimate jurisdiction over certification, though most states currently require national certification for the voting systems.

== Germany ==
In Germany the Physikalisch-Technische Bundesanstalt was responsible for certification of the voting machines for federal and European elections till 2009. Since the respective law, the Bundeswahlgeräteverordnung ("Federal Voting Machine Ordinance") is considered to be in contradiction to Germany's Constitution, this responsibility is suspended. The only machines certified so far are the Nedap ESD1 and ESD2.

== United States ==
The US Election Assistance Commission has assumed federal responsibility for accrediting voting system test laboratories and certifying voting equipment through the Voting System Certification & Laboratory Accreditation Program. The purpose of the program is to independently verify that voting systems comply with the functional capabilities, accessibility, and security requirements necessary to ensure the integrity and reliability of voting system operation, as established in the Voluntary Voting System Guidelines (VVSG). With this program the National Institute of Standards and Technology (NIST) will recommend labs for accreditation through its National Voluntary Laboratory Accreditation Program (NVLAP).

== See also ==
- Election Assistance Commission
- Electronic voting
- Help America Vote Act
- Independent verification systems
- National Institute of Standards and Technology
- National Software Reference Library
- Preventing Election fraud: Testing and certification of electronic voting
- Technical Guidelines Development Committee of the National Institute of Standards and Technology
- Voting machine
