= Victoria Buckley =

American politician (1947–1999)

32nd Secretary of State of Colorado
- In office January 10, 1995 – July 14, 1999
- Governor: Roy Romer; Bill Owens
- Preceded by: Natalie Meyer
- Succeeded by: Donetta Davidson

Personal details
- Born: November 2, 1949 Denver, Colorado, U.S.
- Died: July 14, 1999 (aged 49) Denver, Colorado, U.S.
- Party: Republican

Victoria Buckley (November 2, 1949 – July 14, 1999) was an American politician who served as the Secretary of State of Colorado from 1995 to 1999.

== Early life, education, and career ==
Victoria "Vikki" Buckley was born November 2, 1949, in Denver, Colorado, to Charles and Rubye Bell Buckley. Raised in the Park Hill neighborhood, Buckley graduated from East High School and earned an associate degree in drafting. Buckley began working in the Secretary of State's office as a clerk-typist in 1974, working in the different divisions of the department and being appointed to the position of deputy Secretary of State.

== Political career ==
Buckley announced her candidacy for Colorado Secretary of State following the news of incumbent Natalie Meyer choosing to retire and was a surprise winner in the Republican party primary elections over three other candidates: Denver election commissioner Sandy Adams, state party vice chairman Mary Dambman, and congressional staffer Connie Solomon. In the general election, Buckley challenged Democratic candidate Sherrie Wolf and Constitution Party candidate Douglas Campbell; Daniel Brewer Ward, who had been a candidate in the Democratic primary, was a write-in candidate. Buckley won the election with over 57% of the vote and became the first black woman in Colorado to hold a statewide office.

Colorado Secretary of State election, 1994
| Party | Candidate | Votes | % |
|---|---|---|---|
| Republican | Victoria "Vikki" Buckley | 622,281 | 57.36 |
| Democratic | Sherrie M. Wolf | 393,980 | 36.32 |
| Constitution | Douglas Campbell | 68,410 | 6.31 |
| Write-In | Daniel Brewer-Ward | 153 | 0.01 |
| Total votes | | 1,084,824 | 100 |

Buckley quickly began making changes in the Secretary of State's office after being sworn in. A performance audit ordered by the state legislature during that year showed a significant level of employee turnover. The high number of unfilled positions in the department led to two statewide initiatives being added to the ballot by default because the deadline to complete the review for addition to the ballot passed before all of the petition signatures could be reviewed. Another initiative, which would permit marijuana use, was ordered onto the ballot after the initiative's backers sued, claiming their petitions were improperly denied.

Buckley did not face any opposition in the 1998 Republican party primary elections. In the general election, Buckley challenged Democratic candidate Ric Bainter, Libertarian Party candidate Geoffrey Lloyd, Reform Party candidate Patricia Craven, Constitution Party candidate Clyde Harkins, and Natural Law Party candidate Rolland Fraser. Buckley won the election with over 49% of the vote.

Colorado Secretary of State election, 1998
| Party | Candidate | Votes | % |
|---|---|---|---|
| Republican | Victoria "Vikki" Buckley | 614,760 | 49.11 |
| Democratic | Ric Bainter | 563,945 | 45.05 |
| Libertarian | Geoffrey Lloyd | 31,765 | 2.54 |
| Reform | Patricia Craven | 16,527 | 1.32 |
| Constitution | Clyde Harkins | 14,668 | 1.17 |
| Natural Law | Rolland Fraser | 10,234 | 0.82 |
| Total votes | | 1,722,096 | 100 |

The same day Buckley was sworn into office for her second term, she sought medical attention for heart issues. She was treated for an irregular heartbeat, given anti-clotting medication, and released from the hospital after six days.

Following the Columbine High School massacre, Buckley spoke at the funeral of Isaiah Shoels, one of the massacre victims, and was the only state constitutional officer to address the National Rifle Association of America's convention held in Denver less than two weeks after the Columbine massacre.

== Personal life ==
Buckley had three sons, who she raised largely as a single parent.

On July 13, 1999, Buckley was found collapsed in her Denver home by her estranged husband, Todd Newsome, and was transported to University Hospital. She died of cardiac arrest on the following day, July 14, 1999, in Denver, Colorado, at age 51. Buckley was laid in state at the Colorado State Capitol on July 20, 1999, the first person to be honored in that way since 1970. Buckley was entombed in Fairmount Cemetery.

== See also ==
- Black conservatism in the United States
- Buckley v. American Constitutional Law Foundation, Inc.

Political offices
| Preceded by Natalie Meyer | Secretary of State of Colorado; 1995–1999 | Succeeded by Donetta Davidson |
