= National Student/Parent Mock Election =

In 1980, the NBC Parent Participation TV Workshop held the first National Student/Parent Mock Election. Through its success, the National Student/Parent Mock Election became a separate nonprofit, nonpartisan organization in 1982. The 1982 Mock Election had over 250,000 participants. This grew to 3.5 million participants in 1988, and as many as 5 million in 1992. In 1996 and 1998, the National Student/Parent Mock Election was also conducted on Votelink.com Results from Secretary of State offices were linked to an interactive map of all 50 states on Votelink.com
