= Rosemary E. Rodriguez =

American politician

Rosemary Rodriguez

Commissioner of the Election Assistance Commission
- In office February 2007 - February 28, 2009
- President: George W. Bush

Rosemary E. Rodriguez is the State Director for Senator Michael Bennet of Colorado. She served previously as a commissioner on the U.S. Election Assistance Commission, and chaired the commission in 2008. Prior to that, Rodriguez served on the Denver City Council of the City and County of Denver, District 3, Colorado, United States.

Rodriguez served on a 15-member panel assembled by the Denver Mayor John Hickenlooper investigating faults within the Denver Election Commission that may have contributed to problems in the 2006 elections. She has supported an all-mail ballot election for the City and County of Denver.

In November 2006, Sen. Harry Reid (D-NV) submitted the councilwoman's name to President George W. Bush for his consideration for nomination to the Election Assistance Commission, replacing the position left vacant by former Commissioner Ray Martinez III. Rodriguez accepted the nomination, and on December 6, 2006, Rodriguez's nomination was sent to the Senate for confirmation. Rodriguez was confirmed by the Senate on February 15, 2007.

Rodriguez served on the Denver City Council for three years, and was council president from 2005 to 2006.

Rodriguez is a member of the National Association of Latino Elected and Appointed Officials (NALEO).
