= Donetta Davidson =

American politician

Chairperson of the Election Assistance Commission
- In office February 2010 – December 12, 2011
- President: Barack Obama
- Preceded by: Gineen Bresso
- In office January 3, 2007 – January 17, 2008
- President: George W. Bush
- Preceded by: Paul DeGregorio
- Succeeded by: Rosemary Rodriguez

Secretary of State of Colorado
- In office July 21, 1999 – July 28, 2005
- Governor: Bill Owens
- Preceded by: Victoria Buckley
- Succeeded by: Gigi Dennis

Personal details
- Born: 1943 (age 82–83) Liberal, Kansas, U.S.
- Party: Republican

Donetta L. Davidson was a member of the United States Election Assistance Commission and served as Secretary of State of Colorado. She was elected Chair of the EAC for 2010. She previously served as Chair in 2007 and Vice-Chair in 2008. Her term of service extended through December 12, 2011.

== Career ==
Before joining the EAC, Davidson served as a local election official in Colorado and was the secretary of state of Colorado from 1999 until 2005. A Republican, she was first appointed to the office in 1999 by Governor Bill Owens and was subsequently elected to the office in her own right in 2000 and was re-elected to a full four-year term in 2002.

As Secretary of State she gained both praise and criticism for cleaning up Colorado's voter rolls, a controversial move that resulted in nearly one in five names (19.4 percent) being deleted from the voting rolls.

In 2005 Davidson was elected President of the National Association of Secretaries of State. She also served on the Election Assistance Commission's Technical Guidelines Committee and on the Federal Election Commission's Advisory Panel.

Political offices
Preceded by Victoria Buckley	Secretary of State of Colorado; 1999–2005	Succeeded by Gigi Dennis
Preceded by Paul DeGregorio	Chairperson of the Election Assistance Commission; 2007–2008	Succeeded by Rosemary Rodriguez
Preceded by Gineen Beach	Chairperson of the Election Assistance Commission; 2010–2011	
