= Gigi Dennis =

American politician

Secretary of State of Colorado
- In office September 26, 2005 – January 9, 2007
- Governor: Bill Owens
- Preceded by: Donetta Davidson
- Succeeded by: Mike Coffman

Member of the Colorado Senate from the 5th district
- In office January 11, 1995 – March 30, 2001
- Preceded by: Robert Pastore
- Succeeded by: Lewis Entz

Personal details
- Born: Ginette Davis; November 28, 1961 (age 64)
- Party: Republican
- Spouse: Mark Lounsbury
- Profession: Public administrator, politician, customer service manager, city manager

Ginette E. Dennis (born November 28, 1961) is an American politician from Colorado, U.S. A Republican, she served as Secretary of State of Colorado from 2005 to 2006. She was appointed Secretary of State by Governor Bill Owens and succeeded Donetta Davidson. Previously, she was elected to the Colorado State Senate and served there from 1994 to 2001.

== Career ==
Dennis began her career by being elected to the Colorado Senate in 1994, representing District 5, which at the time included all or parts of Pueblo, Huerfano, Las Animas Alamosa, Conejos, Costilla, Mineral, Rio Grande, Saguache and Custer counties. She was re-elected in 1998 but resigned about halfway through her second term to accept a position in the Bush Administration. She served as the Colorado State Director of USDA Rural Development. She served in this position for four and one-half years.

In September 2005, Colorado Governor Bill Owens appointed her to serve as Colorado Secretary of State following the resignation of Donetta Davidson. She served in this position until January 2007.

Next, she served as Senior Manager of External Affairs for Tri-State Generation and Transmission. In May 2016, she was appointed county administrator for Alamosa County, Colorado. As Alamosa County Administrator, she was involved in bringing a radar for weather information to Alamosa County.

In 2022, she became the city manager for Monte Vista, Colorado.
