= Election Assistance Commission =

American government agency

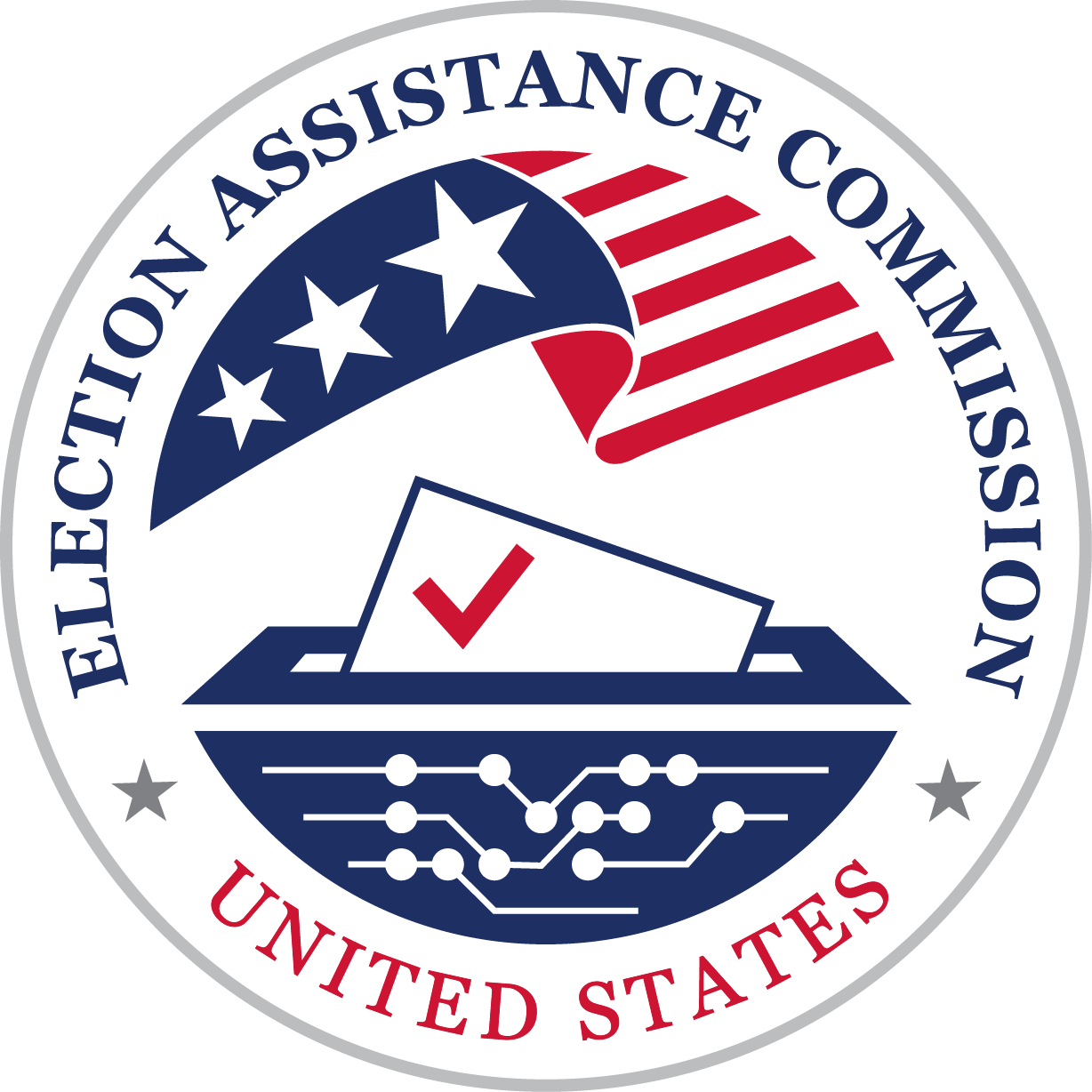
- Official seal

- Official logo

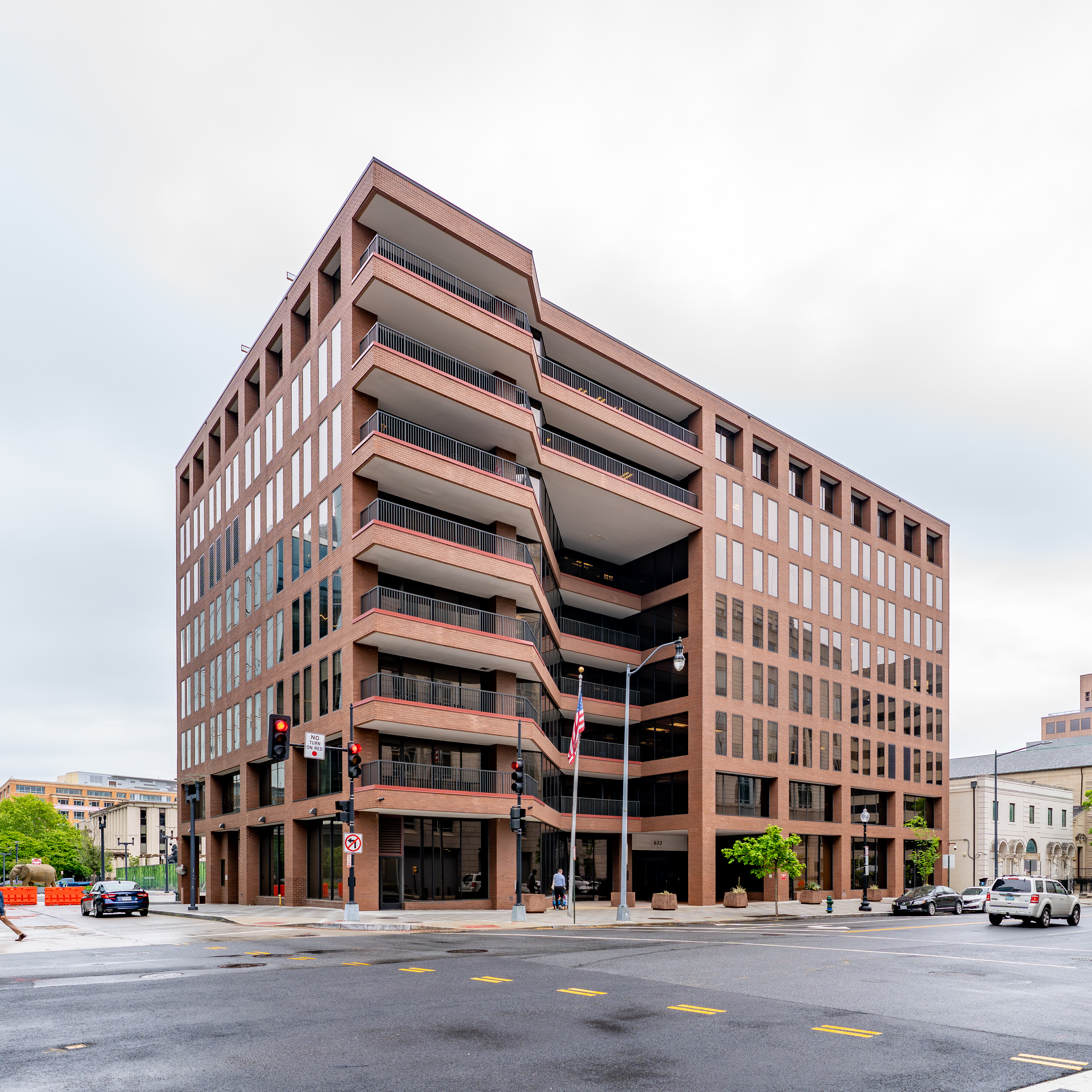
- Headquarters in Washington, D.C.

Agency overview
- Formed: 2002
- Jurisdiction: United States of America
- Headquarters: Washington, D.C.
- Employees: 55
- Annual budget: $28 million (FY 2023)
- Agency executive: Brianna Schletz,
- Website: www.eac.gov

The Election Assistance Commission (EAC) is an independent agency of the United States government created by the Help America Vote Act of 2002 (HAVA). The Commission serves as a national clearinghouse and resource of information regarding election administration. It is charged with administering payments to states and developing guidance to meet HAVA requirements, adopting voluntary voting system guidelines, and accrediting voting system test laboratories and certifying voting equipment. It is also charged with developing and maintaining a national mail voter registration form.

== Responsibilities ==
The EAC is tasked with performing a number of election-related duties including:

- creating and maintaining the Voluntary Voting System Guidelines
- creating a national program for the testing, certification, and decertification of voting systems
- maintaining the National Mail Voter Registration Form required by the National Voter Registration Act of 1993 (NVRA)
- reporting to Congress every two years on the effects of the NVRA on elections
- administering federal funds to States for HAVA requirements
- administering federal funds for the development of innovative election technology, including pilot programs to test election technology
- studying and reporting best practices of effective administration
- communicating information on laws, technologies, procedures, studies, and data related to the administration of federal elections to those responsible for formulating or implementing election law and procedures, to the media, and to other interested persons

The HAVA requires the EAC will create voluntary guidelines for voting systems, maintaining a clearinghouse of information regarding election administration procedures including testing and certification of election equipment, and administering the Election Assistance and Help America Vote Programs.

The EAC publishes the Election Administration and Voting Survey, a study examining how states administer federal elections, every two years.

== History ==
In 2003, Congress appropriated US$1.5 billion for HAVA. The General Services Administration distributed most of the $650 million permitted under Title I of HAVA, and the remainder was earmarked for the EAC to disburse. The funds were not distributed because the commissioners were not confirmed until December 9, 2003; the law had required that they be in place by February 26, 2003. The initial Commissioners were:

- DeForest Soaries Jr. (2003–2005)
- Ray Martinez, III (2003–2006)
- Paul S. DeGregorio (2003–2007)
- Gracia Hillman (2003–2010)

In its 2004 budget, Congress again allocated $1.5 billion to fund HAVA. By January 2004, the EAC did not have permanent offices or budget, even though it was required to publish state election reform plans in the Federal Register before money for new voting equipment could be disbursed to the states.

On December 6, 2006 Caroline Hunter and Rosemary E. Rodriguez were nominated by President George W. Bush to replace Ray Martinez and Paul DeGregorio. They were confirmed by the U.S. Senate on February 15, 2007.

In 2010, the EAC lost its quorum of Commissioners, after the resignation or end of term of Hunter (2008), Rodriguez (2009) and Hillman (2010), preventing many normal operational duties; and was without any Commissioners by 2011 after the resignation of Davidson. Bills were subsequently drafted to end the Commission. Specifically, U.S. Representative Gregg Harper introduced a bill to wind up the EAC and transfer some of its functions to the Federal Election Commission.

The EAC did not regain a quorum until December 16, 2014, when the U.S. Senate confirmed three Commissioners, Thomas Hicks, Matthew V. Masterson, and Christy McCormick. Masterson resigned in 2018; and on January 2, 2019, President Donald Trump's nominees, Benjamin Hovland and Donald Palmer, were confirmed by the US Senate, and took office in February 2019. In July 2026, President Donald Trump removed the remaining members of the commission several months before the midterm elections. The two Democratic commissioners, Thomas Hicks and Benjamin Hovland, were dismissed by the White House, while Republican commissioner Christy McCormick resigned. The White House said that Trump had the authority to remove members of independent federal agencies and cited a recent Supreme Court decision as the basis for the action. Democrats and voting rights advocates criticized the removals, saying they weakened an independent agency that supports election officials, certifies voting systems, and provides guidance on election administration.

== Chair and commissioners ==
The Help America Vote Act specifies that four commissioners are nominated by the President on recommendations from the majority and minority leadership in the U.S. House and U.S. Senate. Once confirmed by the full Senate, commissioners may serve two consecutive terms and no more than two commissioners may belong to the same political party. The terms lasts for four years, but commissioners may continue serving after the expiration of their term until their successor has taken office. The Commission selects a chair and vice chair from among its members for a term of one year. The chair and vice chair may not be affiliated with the same political party. A member of the Commission can only serve one term as chair and vice chair each during each of their terms as members.

=== Current commissioners ===
As of July 9, 2026, there are no commissioners. In July 2026, with one empty seat, two of the three sitting commissioners were dismissed by the president and the remaining commissioner resigned, leaving the commission without a member.

=== Former commissioners ===
Former commissioners include:

- DeForest Soaries Jr. (2003–2005)
- Ray Martinez, III (2003–2006)
- Paul S. DeGregorio (2003–2007)
- Caroline Hunter (2007–2008)
- Rosemary E. Rodriguez (2007–2009)
- Gracia Hillman (2003–2010)
- Donetta Davidson (2005–2011)
- Gineen Bresso (2008–2011)
- Matthew Masterson (2014–2018)
- Donald L. Palmer (2019–2026)
- Thomas Hicks (2015–2026, dismissed)
- Christy McCormick (2015–2026)
- Benjamin W. Hovland (2019–2026, dismissed)

== Officers and staff ==
=== Executive Director ===
The current Executive Director of the EAC is Steven Frid, who succeeded Interim Executive Director, Mark A. Robbins. Prior to him, Mona Harrington served as Executive Director. She succeeded Brian Newby, who served a four-year term from October 2015 to October 2019. Newby succeeded Thomas R. Wilkey, the agency's first Executive Director, who resigned in November 2011. Prior to the EAC, Wilkey served a four-year term as the executive director of the New York State Board of Elections beginning in 2003. He worked 34 years in the field of election administration. The executive director position was created by HAVA § 204(a).

=== General Counsel ===
The current Acting General Counsel is Amanda Joiner. Prior to her, the General Counsel was Kevin Rayburn. The previous General Counsel was Clifford Tatum, who served a four-year term (October 2015 to October 2019). The agency's first General Counsel, serving under the Executive Director, was Juliet E. Thompson. She previously held the position of Associate General Counsel at the Independent Insurance Agents & Brokers of America, and General Counsel of the Louisiana Department of Elections and Registration.

=== Inspector General ===
The current Inspector General is Sarah Dreyer. The Office of the Inspector General is tasked with detecting and preventing fraud, waste, abuse, and mismanagement of EAC programs, regularly performing audits and evaluations.

Brianna Schletz previously served as the Inspector General.

== Standards Board ==
The EAC Standards Board was established under title II section 211 of HAVA. Its duties include reviewing the voluntary voting systems guidelines and review of the best practices recommendations. The Board consists of 110 members, 55 State election officials and 55 local election officials. The Board adopts resolutions and makes recommendations by simple majority vote.(see a full list of Standards Board members)

The Board selects nine of its members as an Executive Board of whom, no more than five may be State election officials; no more than five may be local election officials; and no more than five may be members of the same political party. (see a full list of Executive Board members)

== Board of Advisors ==
The EAC Board of Advisors was established under title II section 211 of HAVA. Like those of the Standards Board, the Board of Advisors' duties include reviewing the voluntary voting systems guidelines and review of the best practices recommendations. The Board consists of appointed members. Two members being appointed by each of the National Governors Association, the National Conference of State Legislatures, the National Association of Secretaries of State, the National Association of State Election Directors, the National Association of Counties, the National Association of County Recorders, Election Officials, and Clerks (NACRC), the United States Conference of Mayors, the Election Center, the International Association of County Recorders, Election Officials, and Treasurers (IACREOT), the United States Commission on Civil Rights, and the Architectural and Transportation Barrier Compliance Board. The Board also includes the chief of the Office of Public Integrity of the Department of Justice, the Chief of the Voting Section of the Civil Rights Division at the U.S. Department of Justice, and the director of the Federal Voting Assistance Program of the Department of Defense. Further, the Board also includes four members representing professionals in the field of science and technology, one appointed by the Speaker and one by the Minority Leader of the House of Representatives, one appointed by the Majority Leader and one by the Minority Leader of the Senate. Of the eight final members of the Board, four members are appointed by the United States House Committee on House Administration and four members are appointed by the United States Senate Committee on Rules and Administration. (see a full list of Advisory Board members)

== Technical Guidelines Development Committee ==
The Technical Guidelines Development Committee (TGDC) is tasked with assisting the EAC in drafting the Voluntary Voting System Guidelines. The Committee membership consists of the Director of the National Institute of Standards and Technology (NIST); 14 members appointed jointly by the EAC and the Director of NIST from the Standards Board, the Board of Advisors, the Architectural and Transportation Barrier, and the Access Board, a representative of American National Standards Institute (ANSI), a representative of the IEEE, two representatives of the NASED, and other individuals with technical and scientific expertise relating to voting systems and voting equipment. (see a full list of TGDC members)

== Criticisms ==
Critics have contended that the EAC has responded positively to political pressure from the Republican Party and the Department of Justice. For example, the EAC is said to have overstated the problem of voter fraud, which is often cited by Republicans as a justification for restrictive measures that Democrats charge are intended to prevent qualified Democrats from voting. The EAC Chair denied that there was any political pressure. Tova Wang, a consultant to the Commission, wrote a detailed account in The Washington Post about how her research and that of her Republican co-author had been disregarded or altered by the EAC, to produce a published report "that completely stood our own work on its head." The changes included exaggerating the purported voter fraud issue and omitting references to charges of voter intimidation lodged by Democrats, as well as removing all criticisms of the George W. Bush administration's Department of Justice that the report had incorporated.

In 2009, the United States Office of Special Counsel issued a report that found that the EAC engaged in political discrimination in federal hiring against an attorney to fill the General Counsel position because he was a Republican. The report was in response to a settlement between the attorney and the EAC, in which the attorney was paid an unspecified amount of money.

In 2019, an article in Politico reported that Newby had been the subject of extensive criticism from within and without the agency since his hiring in 2015, culminating in multiple calls for his resignation from Democratic members of the House and the Senate. Anonymous sources reported that Newby played a large role in many EAC staffers leaving, including the departure of Ryan Macias, the acting director of election testing and certification, as well as his predecessor, Brian Hancock. These departures "knocked the wind out of the technical sails of the EAC," said an anonymous voting security researcher. Exacerbating the situation was the reporter's speculation of the partisan nature of Newby's hiring, with the article labeling him a Republican and the Commissioner who recommended his being hired, Christy McCormick, as well. In February 2016, Newby approved requests from three states to change state-specific instructions on the NVRA federal form related to proof of citizenship for voter registration. These states required proof of citizenship by state law, a controversial policy being pushed by conservative GOP members such as Kris Kobach of Kansas, that would be used in support of Donald Trump's widely discredited claim that millions of illegal votes had been cast in the 2016 presidential election and had denied Trump a majority in the popular vote. An injunction was placed on the changes by a US Appeals court, although the case remained with the US District Court.

== Certification of voting machines ==
The US Election Assistance Commission has assumed federal responsibility for accrediting voting system test laboratories and certifying voting equipment through the Voting System Certification & Laboratory Accreditation Program. The purpose of the program is to independently verify that voting systems comply with the functional capabilities, accessibility, and security requirements necessary to ensure the integrity and reliability of voting system operation, as established in the Voluntary Voting System Guidelines (VVSG). With this program the National Institute of Standards and Technology (NIST) will recommend labs for accreditation through its National Voluntary Laboratory Accreditation Program (NVLAP).

The VVSG provide a set of specifications and requirements against which voting systems can be tested to determine if the systems provide all of the basic functionality, accessibility and security capabilities required of these systems. In addition, the guidelines establish evaluation criteria for the national certification of voting systems.

The EAC's Technical Guidelines Development Committee, with technical support from NIST are tasked with developing an initial set of recommendations for each VVSG iteration. After the initial draft guidelines are authored, they are sent to the EAC for review and revision and then released for public comment. Comments are reviewed and considered by the EAC in consultation with NIST in development of the final release.

In 2007, California Secretary of State Debra Bowen decertified four electronic voting systems, three of which were conditionally recertified, after a "top-to-bottom review" of the voting machines certified for use in California in March 2007.

=== VVSG 2.0 (2021) ===
A new version of the VVSG was approved for adoption in February 2021. The VVSG 2.0 represents a significant advancement in defining standards that improves cybersecurity, accessibility, and usability requirements, while also introducing various audit methods supporting software independence to confirm the accuracy of the vote and increase voter confidence.

- VVSG 2.0
- VVSG 2.0 Test Assertions

As of 2021, SLI Compliance and Pro V&V are the only two organizations that the EAC has authorized to certify voting systems in the United States.

=== VVSG 1.1 (2015) ===
A new version of the VVSG was approved in 2015. Voluntary Voting System Guidelines | The U.S. Election Assistance Commission (EAC).

- Volume 1
- Volume 2

=== 2007 VVSG ===
A draft version of the 2007 VVSG was developed by the TGDC and NIST. It was not approved by the TGDC nor the EAC.

=== VVSG 1.0 (2005) ===
The 2005 VVSG, which significantly increased security requirements for voting systems and expanded access, including opportunities to vote privately and independently, for individuals with disabilities, was unanimously adopted by the EAC in December 2005; It was version of the federal certification standards. During the 90-day public comment period, EAC received more than 6,000 comments on the proposed guidelines. These comments and the proposed guidelines are available via the Kennesaw State University. The 2005 VVSG will go into effect 24 months after their final adoption (December 2007).

- VVSG Volume 1
- VVSG Volume 2

=== Certification Origins and Roy Saltman ===
In February 1975 an interagency agreement was formed with General Accounting Office’s Office of Federal Elections (predecessor to the Federal Election Commission) and the National Bureau of Standards (predecessor to the National Institute of Standards and Technology) resulting in a March 1975 report, Effective Use of Computing Technology in Vote-Tallying, authored by Roy Saltman. This report highlighted "the lack of appropriate technical skills at the State and local level for developing or implementing written standards, against which voting system hardware and software could be evaluated."

The U.S. Congress then directed the Federal Election Commission (FEC), in conjunction with the National Bureau of Standards to create engineering and procedural performance standards for voting systems. Another report, Voting System Standards: A Report on the Feasibility of Developing Voluntary Standards for Voting Equipment was produced in early 1984. In July 1984 the FEC armed with congressionally appropriated funds began a six-year task of creating the first national performance and test standards for punchcard, marksense, and direct recording electronic voting systems.

The resulting body of work was the first set of voluntary Voting System Standards issued in 1990.

=== FEC and NASED ===
In addition to their involvement in the origins of national voting certification and testing, the FEC's Office of Election Administration and the National Association of State Election Directors (NASED) updated the initial Voting System Standards with the 2002 Voting System Standards/Guidelines.

The national testing effort was overseen by NASED’s Voting Systems Board, which is composed of election officials and independent technical advisors. NASED established a process for vendors to submit their equipment to an Independent Test Authority (ITA) for evaluation against the Standards. The NASED has compiled a list of Qualified Voting Systems 12-22-05

=== EAC Interim Voting System Certification Program ===
The Help America Vote Act mandated the federal certification process be assumed by the EAC. The EAC implemented an interim certification program in July 2006 which provided a means to obtain federal certification for modifications required by state and local election officials administering the 2006 General Election.

In summer 2006 the EAC barred the company Ciber Inc. from approving further voting machines. Federal officials found that it was not following its quality-control procedures and could not document that it was conducting all the required tests. According to the EAC "Ciber, Inc. has applied for interim accreditation, but EAC has not completed its review, so the Ciber application is pending." They have released relevant documentation regarding the Ciber, Inc. application from accreditation.

== See also ==
- Title 11 of the Code of Federal Regulations
- Federal Election Commission
- Certification of voting machines
- Voting machine
