= National Association of State Election Directors =

The National Association of State Election Directors (NASED) is a U.S. association that was formed in 1989 when a group of state election directors and administrators met in Reno, Nevada. The driving issue at that time that spurred the group to organize was the concern that national networks were releasing presidential election results before all polls had closed.

"The recently enacted Help America Vote Act has increased the importance for communication and coordination among state election directors", its website states. The association serves "as an exchange of best practices and ideas."

== Role in the certification of e-voting machines ==
NASED has recently received attention for its role in the system for certifying e-voting machines. According to a September 2004 report by the Associated Press, "More than a decade ago, the Federal Election Commission authorized the National Association of State Election Directors to choose the independent testers."

A company chosen by NASED to act as a tester is known as an Independent Testing Authority (ITA).
