= Ion Sancho =

American public official

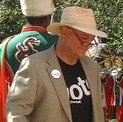
- Sancho in 2008
- Born: Ion Voltaire Sancho; December 6, 1950 (age 75); New York City, New York, U.S.
- Education: Florida State University; Stetson University
- Occupations: Supervisor of Elections for Leon County

Ion Voltaire Sancho (born December 6, 1950) was an elected official who served Leon County, Florida, as Supervisor of Elections for 28 years, from 1989 to 2017. During his time in office, he was admired for his integrity as a voter advocate and elections expert, and became nationally known for his role in the Florida presidential election recount of 2000. He was also known for his appearance in the 2006 investigative documentary Hacking Democracy.

== Early life and education ==
Sancho was born in New York City to Puerto Rican parents and raised in Columbus, Ohio. His father, who had a high-tech job in the Strategic Air Command, gave him the name "Ion". Sancho received his A.A. degree from Valencia Community College in 1973. He then received his B.A. in Social Science from Stetson University in 1978. Sancho completed his education with a J.D. from Florida State University College of Law in 1987.

In 1984 Sancho, a Democrat, was the Leon County leader for Presidential candidate Gary Hart. Sancho was a State Certified Supervisor of Elections and nationally certified by the Election Center as a Certified Elections/Registration Administrator (CERA). Sancho is a former staff member of the Florida House of Representatives, Corrections, Probation & Parole Committee. He was a member of the Center for Policy Alternatives, Voter Participation Advisory Board and member of The Election Center.

== Supervisor of Elections ==
After a bid for county commissioner in 1986, Sancho took courses in election machine management and became certified in their use. In November 1988, Sancho was elected to his first term as the Supervisor of Elections for Leon County, Florida. From 1992 he was unopposed in election until his resignation after the 2016 election.

== National recognition ==
In the 2000 presidential recount, Sancho (No Party Affiliation) was chosen to lead the Florida hand count of ballots in dispute in Miami-Dade County. The U.S. Supreme Court stopped the hand count in a 7-2 vote just as it got underway. Later the Court ruled 5–4 that no constitutionally valid recount could be completed by a December 12 "safe harbor" deadline.

== Hacking a Diebold machine ==
In 2005, Sancho invited Bev Harris, founder of Black Box Voting, Kathleen Wynne, Black Box Voting Associate Director, Harri Hursti, computer programmer and security expert, Dr. Hugh Thompson, application security expert and Ph.D. in math, Susan Bernecker, former Republican candidate for New Orleans city council and Susan Pynchon, Director of Florida Fair Elections Coalition to Tallahassee. There, they performed what is now known as the Hursti Hack which became the centerpiece of an HBO documentary titled Hacking Democracy.

=== Results of Sancho's actions ===
As a result, Diebold, Election Systems & Software and Sequoia Voting Systems, the only three companies certified to do business in Florida, would not sell Sancho voting machines. Automark was contacted by Sancho but the Secretary of State would not certify their voting equipment. ES&S said, "did not believe it could have a smooth working relationship with Sancho".

In Florida, Volusia County joined Leon County in dumping Diebold. Elections officials in the states of Maryland, North Carolina, Texas, and California have called into question the security and accuracy of new voting machines.

I'm very troubled by this, to be honest—I can't believe the way he's being treated. What kind of message is this sending to elections supervisors? "The federal certification process for voting machines is broken, sadly, when it comes to security. It was designed for the era of mechanical machines, and it hasn't kept up.

— David Wagner, computer scientist, the University of California

== Opposition ==
After the test election, Secretary of State Sue Cobb (R) accused Sancho of "undermining voter confidence" and the Federal Government and demanded the return of a $564,000 in grant money given to Sancho through the state to purchase voting machines that would comply with ADA standards as mandated in the Help America Vote Act (HAVA), a United States federal law passed on October 29, 2002.

At Leon County Commission meetings on February 14 and February 28, 2006 the only two Republicans in the local governments of either the city of Tallahassee or Leon County government, Tony Grippa and Ed Depuy of Leon County's seven-member county commission blasted Sancho for failing to provide Leon County with accessible voting machines in attacks that Sancho believes were politically motivated.

At a Leon County Commission meeting on February 28, 2006, county staff revealed that Chuck Owen, Division Counsel for Diebold Election Systems, met with county staff behind closed doors on February 27. According to staff, Owen stated that Diebold would sell its touch-screen voting machines to the county if, and only if, the county removed Supervisor Sancho from office. That same day, Commissioner DePuy offered a motion, seconded by Commissioner Grippa to request the State Attorney to convene a grand jury to investigate why Leon County is not in compliance with the voting regulations.

Tony Grippa left the Leon County Commission in April 2006. Ed DePuy was defeated in 2008 by Democrat Akin Akinyemi.

== Legal action ==
On March 8, 2006 Sancho initiated legal proceedings against Diebold Election Systems for breach of contract. Attorney Lida Rodriguez Taseff with Duane Morris in Miami filed the suit. Diebold refused to return phone calls to Sancho and staff, refused to honor its existing contract with Leon County for the maintenance and upgrades of its voting system. Further, Diebold refused to sell Leon County touch-screen voting machines to meet state and federal requirements for disabled accessibility.

== In the media ==
Sancho has been on National Public Radio and has been featured in the New York Times, the Washington Post, and the St. Petersburg Times. He appears in the 2006 HBO documentary Hacking Democracy as well as in the 2020 documentary Kill Chain: The Cyber War on America's Elections, narrated by hacking expert Harri Hursti.

== See also ==
- Elections in Florida
- Elections in the United States
- Leon County political representation
