= Britain J. Williams =

American academic

Britain J. Williams III is a Professor Emeritus of computer science at Kennesaw State University in Georgia, and is consultant with the school's Center For Election Systems. He has bachelor's and master's degrees in mathematics from the University of Georgia, and a PhD is in Statistics from the University of Georgia in 1965. He joined the faculty of (then) Kennesaw State College in 1990.

He was a consultant to the Federal Election Commission during the development of their Voting System Standards in 1990 and again in 2002. He is currently a member of the National Association of State Election Directors Voting Systems Board and Chair of the Board's Technical Committee. He serves as a consultant to the states of Georgia, Maryland, Pennsylvania and Virginia, where he has certified electronic voting systems. In 2003, he wrote a defense of the Georgia electronic voting system in response to criticism of Diebold Election Systems (now Premier Election Solutions) systems levied by Bev Harris, author of Black Box Voting.

Williams appeared at a United States Election Assistance Commission (EAC) Public Hearing on the Use, Security and Reliability of Electronic Voting Systems in Washington, DC on 5 May 2004. Other technology panelists included Dr. Avi Rubin, Johns Hopkins University, Information Security Institute; Stephen Berger, IEEE; and Dr. Ted Selker, MIT.

Williams is a recognized expert on electronic voting systems; he is a consultant to DES, the FEC, and four states. Williams reportedly has held a key position at the IEEE.
