= Sarah Teale =

British-American filmmaker

Sarah Teale is a British-American documentary film producer and director, known for her Emmy nominated HBO documentaries Hacking Democracy, Dealing Dogs, The Weight of the Nation and Kill Chain: The Cyber War on America’s Elections.

== Early life and education ==
Teale grew up in rural England, the daughter Mike Teale, an English country veterinary surgeon, and Christina Sawtelle Teale, an American classical concert and festival producer. Teale attended St. Hilda's College at the University of Oxford where she received her degree in English in 1983.

== Career ==
Teale began her career working for WGBH, Boston in local news and documentaries and then for WNET, New York on the financial series Adam Smith's Money World. She was an associate producer and researcher on the joint Channel 4 and PBS docuseries Art of the Western World. In 1988 she formed her own company, Teale Productions Inc., to set up shoots for British filmmakers, including the BBC, Channel 4 and ITV, and to book celebrities for British talks shows, including Wogan, Jonathan Ross, and Michael Aspell.

In 1992, Teale produced Horst P Horst: Sixty Years and Still in Vogue, an episode for BBC's Ominbus series about iconic Vogue photographer Horst P. Horst.

In 1996, she was co-producer on Mumia Abu-Jamal: A Case for Reasonable Doubt? for HBO with producer/director John Edginton. The documentary won a CableACE Award. In 1997, Teale produced Sam Shepard: Stalking Himself with director Oren Jacoby as part of the PBS Great Performances series and BBC Omnibus.

In 2000, Teale partnered with Sian Edwards to form Teale-Edwards Productions. The company became known for its documentaries as well as lifestyle programming including Everyday Italian.

In the early 2000s, Teale produced two films for HBO's America Undercover series. Along with director Maryann DeLeo, Teale filmed almost every day for a year inside the locked psychiatric ward of Bellevue Hospital to produce Bellevue: Inside/Out (2001), and in 2006, she produced/directed Dealing Dogs with producer/director Tom Simon. Dealing Dogs followed an undercover operative for Last Chance for Animals known only as 'Pete' as he infiltrated and recorded the abuse at a Class B kennel in Arkansas. The film was nominated for two Emmy awards and won a Genesis Award for Outstanding Cable Documentary.

Teale was an executive producer on HBO Films' Emmy nominated documentary Hacking Democracy in 2006. The film follows Bev Harris as she investigates the gaps in security of America's electronic voting systems. In one scene in the film, hacker and cyber-security expert Harri Hursti demonstrated a vulnerability in Diebold Election Systems voting machines by hacking the system using one of the system's memory cards, changing all the votes in a "mini-election" held by an election supervisor in Leon County, Florida. The hack was virtually undetectable.

In 2009, Teale collaborated again with Tom Simon on a second film with 'Pete', Death on a Factory Farm, which documented the conditions on an Ohio hog farm. It also won a Genesis Award.

In 2012, Teale was nominated for an Emmy for her work as a producer for HBO's four-part documentary series The Weight of the Nation.

Teale and Sian Edwards-Beal dissolved their partnership in 2012, and she returned to heading up Teale Productions Inc.

Teale planned to take a year off at her family's farm in upstate New York after the release of The Weight of the Nation, but instead formed a cooperative of grass-fed beef farmers. She and filmmaker Lisa F. Jackson spent two years filming the farmers and the process of forming the co-op. Their film, Grazers: A Cooperative Story premiered in 2014 as part of Doc NYC.

Teale and Jackson collaborated again in 2018 on Patrimonio. The documentary follows the struggles of the fishing community in Todos Santos, Mexico against the U.S.-based Black Creek Group who planned on building a large hotel and condo complex on the beaches, which would have restricted access to the beach that the locals have fished for at least a century and used up the limited water supply for the town. Patrimonio was selected for 15 film festivals, including the Berlin International Film Festival, Final Frame, and Doc NYC. It won the Audience Award at the 2018 San Francisco Green Film Festival.

After the 2016 election, Teale, along with her Hacking Democracy collaborators Simon Ardizzone and Russell Michaels, began pitching a follow-up film about the vulnerabilities that still existed in America's voting systems 14 years after the first film exposed them. They began filming with cyber-security expert Harri Hursti in 2017 and followed him for almost three years as he traveled the world to explore the issue. The resulting film, Kill Chain: The Cyber War on America’s Elections premiered on HBO on March 26, 2020. It was nominated for an Emmy for Outstanding Investigative Documentary in 2021.
