= VoteHere =

VoteHere (also known as VoteHere.net and Dategrity) was an American voting software company based in Bellevue, Washington. Its founder, president and chief executive officer was Jim Adler. The company was recognized as one of the earliest developers of end-to-end (E2E) auditable voting systems.

== History ==
The company was initially formed in 1996 as Soundcode, which built software for data security. By 1999, they had pivoted to build an encryption-based online voting system. They ran three online elections in 2000: the 2000 Republican National Convention, the Alaska Republican straw poll and a contract vote by the Society of Professional Engineering Employees in Aerospace. They also had several pilots for online voting in Arizona and California that year.

In 2004, VoteHere freely released all of its source code online, being the first online voting company to do so. By 2005, VoteHere had been used in 90 private and governmental elections, primarily outside the United States. For example, they were used as a pilot in a May 2002 election in Swindon, England.

VoteHere worked with two voting equipment vendors as of 2004: Advanced Voting Solutions and Sequoia Voting Systems.

In March 2005, VoteHere changed their name to Dategrity, with VoteHere becoming a division of Dategrity. Dategrity planned to expand its focus on data and privacy auditing. In 2007, a new company, Demoxi, acquired about 50 patents from Dategrity, including for online voting. Dategrity planned to continue working on online voting for public elections, while Demoxi would focus on personal data management. Election Trust, another company in Bellevue, became the exclusive reseller of VoteHere services that same year, leading to confusion among local politicians. In 2009, Election Trust acquired some licenses and patents from Dategrity, including a mail-in ballot tracker. Demoxi changed its name to Identity.net.

== Products ==
In 2003, VoteHere offered two software products: VHTi and RemoteVote. VHTi was intended for confirming electronic voting machine results, while RemoteVote was meant to provide security for online voting. VoteHere also offered MiBT (Mail-in Ballot Tracker) for auditing mail-in ballots.

== Funding ==
VoteHere received funding from Cisco, Compaq and Northwest Venture Associates, totaling $15 million by 2002. It raised an additional $4.2 million in March 2005.

== Leadership ==
The board of directors for VoteHere has included Ralph Munro, Bill Owens, and Robert Gates. Avi Rubin was previously on the board, but had resigned in 2003.

== Controversies ==
VoteHere's system was criticized for being lacking in privacy and security in a 2001 paper.

In February 2003, a former software engineer, Dan Spillane, sued VoteHere for wrongful termination and for ignoring his findings on potential flaws in company software. In the lawsuit, he claimed that he shared about 250 defect reports, including about logging votes and user experience for voters. Spillane said that VoteHere executives did not fully cooperate with independent testing authorities (ITAs) and that he was fired hours before he was to meet with officials from the ITA and the General Accounting Office. He said separately that the ITAs would still certify voting equipment even when his employer knew there were severe problems with those systems. The lawsuit was settled by November 2003.

In October 2003, the corporate network of VoteHere was breached by an intruder, and the case was investigated by the FBI, the U.S. Secret Service and local law enforcement. VoteHere was planning to publish its source code at the time, stating their plan to do so in June 2003. The company suspected involvement of electronic voting machine critics. Adler said that the hacker may have also been involved with the 2003 leak of documents from Diebold Election Systems, but Bev Harris disagreed. Both Harris and Adler said that someone stealing source code that was planned to be released made little sense. Harris was interviewed by the Secret Service at least five times about the VoteHere hack, but she said that most of the discussions were about Diebold and that the government requested visitor logs of her website. Refusing, she said that she was threatened with a subpoena from a federal grand jury. According to Harris, after her story was published by Seattle Weekly, no further action was taken.

In 2005, VoteHere paid Mirram Global $10,000 a month to lobby New York state legislators, partially to "prevent a new law that requires paper ballots" in New York. At the time, state legislators were working on laws to comply with the Help America Vote Act (HAVA). Roberto Ramirez was a partner in Mirram Global. According to Harris, VoteHere spent more than Diebold, ES&S, and Sequoia combined to lobby for the passage of HAVA.

In 2009, four Washington state residents and the San Juan County Green Party filed a lawsuit against then Washington Secretary of State Sam Reed and San Juan County Auditor Milene Henley, alleging that their use of systems from Hart Intercivic and VoteHere violated voters' privacy through unique bar code identifiers. In 2013, Henley decided to abandon the Mail-in Ballot Tracking system, after a judge ruled its use violated Washington state law by not being federally certified.
