= Volusia error =

Electronic voting issue in 2000

The Volusia error was an incident that occurred during the 2000 United States presidential election in Florida.

== The error ==
Late in the night on November 7, 2000 the US election had come down to a tight race over Florida and its 25 electoral votes. Both Al Gore and George W. Bush were within 25 electoral votes of the necessary count to win the presidency, so the entire race boiled down to the contest in Florida.

In Volusia County, Florida a strange error was discovered upon reviewing the electronic voting results. As Dana Milbank of The Washington Post put it:

Something very strange happened on election night to Deborah Tannenbaum, a Democratic Party official in Volusia County. At 10 p.m., she called the county elections department and learned that Al Gore was leading George W. Bush 83,000 votes to 62,000. But when she checked the county's Web site for an update half an hour later, she found a startling development: Gore's count had dropped by 16,000 votes, while an obscure Socialist candidate had picked up 10,000--all because of a single precinct with only 600 voters.

The error cropped up in Volusia's 216th precinct of only 585 registered voters. A Global Election Systems (acquired by Diebold Election Systems, now Premier Election Solutions) voting machine showed that 412 of those registered voters had voted. The problem was that the machine also claimed those 412 voters had somehow given Bush 2,813 votes and in addition had given Gore a negative vote count of -16,022 votes (Green Party candidate Ralph Nader was shown to have an even larger negative vote, though he was not considered a likely winner of the whole Florida election).

== The call ==
Most major television news networks had originally called Florida for Gore (before the polls closed in Florida), but retracted the call around 10 p.m. EST. Fox News was the first to lead the charge the other way, acting on data that included this impossible Volusia County 216th precinct data, completely altering the close race with a sudden 18,000+ vote margin opening up for Bush over Gore. Fox News called Florida for Bush at 2:16 a.m. on November 8, with other networks following in the next few minutes. These calls were then retracted and Florida declared too close to call once the Volusia error was reported to the networks.

The significance of the call is highlighted by Philip Meyer in his piece for the USA Today which stated:

From then on, nothing Democrats could do would overcome the appearance that they were trying to steal the election on technicalities. And nothing Republicans could say would overcome the suspicion that they had planned the whole thing.

== Correction ==
The error was caught and corrected the night of the election. Of the registered voters in the precinct, 22 voted for Bush, 193 for Gore, and 1 for Nader. However, the error did cause embarrassment and scrutiny both for Volusia election workers and for GES, provider of the electronic ballots. According to Jake Tapper, on January 17, 2001 Volusia elections employee Lana Hires (not the Supervisor of Elections, as incorrectly reported by Tapper) wrote a memo to GES officials, stating,

I need some answers! Our department is being audited by the County ... I have been waiting for someone to give me an explanation as to why Precinct 216 gave Al Gore a minus 16022 when it was uploaded. Will someone please explain this so that I have the information to give the auditor instead of standing here 'looking dumb.'

The facts and story of Al Gore's minus 16,022 vote anomaly in Volusia County are the subject of the controversial 2006 HBO documentary Hacking Democracy which climaxes in the on-camera hacking of the same Diebold system used in Volusia in 2000. That hack, now known as the 'Hursti Hack,' allegedly used negative votes to rig the votes on the Diebold voting system.
