= Hursti =

Hursti is a Finnish surname. Notable people with the surname include:

- Harri Hursti (born 1968), Finnish computer programmer
- Veikko Hursti (1924–2005), Finnish philanthropist
