= Election Center =

The Election Center is a nonprofit based in Houston, Texas. They are involved in training election officials in the United States.

== History ==
According to a 1988 NIST report by Roy G. Saltman, Election Center was established in 1984 by the Academy for State and Local Government, a nonprofit research group.

In 1994, the Election Center offered to work with the National Association of State Election Directors (NASED) for free on certifying voting system test labs and tracking voting equipment approvals. The Election Center stopped working with the testing labs in 2003.

== Leadership ==
R. Doug Lewis was the executive director between 1994 and 2015. Board directors, as of 2004, included the "executive secretary-director of North Carolina's board of elections, the secretary of state of Colorado, and the Pennington County (South Dakota) auditor".

In 2002, Theresa LePore was a member of the Election Center National Task Force on Voting Accessibility.

== Funding ==
In 2002, the Election Center had a budget of $462,000. In 2004, Lewis said that most of the budget for Election Center is based on membership dues and training fees. He also acknowledged funding also comes from donations by Sequoia Voting Systems, Election Systems & Software, and "probably" Diebold Election Systems. Between 1997 and 2000, Sequoia had donated $10,000 per year. All three of these voting machine vendors co-sponsored a conference alongside Election Center in 2004. Sequoia and Global Election Systems also co-sponsored an Election Center conference in 2000.
