= Plateau effect =

Diminishing returns over time

Curve exhibiting a plateau between steeply ascending sections.

The plateau effect is a phenomenon that lessens the effectiveness of once effective measures over time. An example of the plateau effect is when someone's exercise fails to be as effective as in the past, similar to the concept of diminishing returns. A person enters into a period where there is no improvement or a decrease in performance.

== Overview ==
The plateau effect may appear in learning, when students experience a dwindling (less steady) benefit from their learning effort. Studies of elementary school students have found there is a plateau effect in reading level during the upper elementary years. This effect is shown in the forgetting curve developed by Hermann Ebbinghaus, who established the hypothesis of the exponential nature of forgetting. Ebbinghaus hypothesized that the use of the ancient mnemonic device, Method of Loci, and spaced repetition can help overcome the plateau effect.

The plateau effect is also experienced in acclimation, which is the process that allows organisms to adjust to changes in its environment. In humans, this is seen when the nose becomes acclimated to a certain smell. This immunity is the body's natural defense to distraction from stimulus. This is similar to drug tolerance, when a person's reaction to a specific drug is progressively reduced, requiring an increase in the amount of the drug they receive. Over the counter medications, in particular, have a maximum possible effect, regardless of dose.

== Health and fitness ==
In fitness, the Exercise Plateau Effect refers to when a body becomes accustomed to a certain stimulus and thus ceases to respond to it. Overcoming the plateau usually involves a change in the person's workout, including adding periods of rest, changing volume of exercises, or increasing/decreasing the weight used in strength exercises.

== Television ratings ==
According to industry consultant Gary Kahan, a television show's ratings plateau after the show reaches a "crescendo" and then slowly decline over time.

== Paradox of the pesticides ==
An example of the plateau effect is found in the paradox of the pesticides. The paradox states that applying pesticide to a pest may end up increasing the abundance of the pest if the pesticide upsets natural predator–prey dynamics in the ecosystem.

=== Paradox in testing ===
In testing, when the same test case is run repeatedly on a product under test, the test case becomes ineffective and may induce costs, notably in maintenance.

== The "deliberate practice" theory ==
In the book Moonwalking with Einstein by Joshua Foer, a theory called "deliberate practice" is brought up. The theorist that came up with this theory was K. Anders Ericsson who said: "Our civilization has always recognized exceptional individuals, whose performance in sports, the arts, and science is vastly superior to that of the rest of the population".

This quote coincides with the three stages because these would be the main topics or ideas that would come in mind to reach the plateau effect in many of people. When these conditions are met, practice improves accuracy and speed of performance on cognitive, perceptual, and motor tasks.

== Three stages ==
The plateau effect was mentioned in the book Moonwalking With Einstein by Joshua Foer. The book mentions the three stages that lead up to "The Plateau Effect"; the theory of the three stages was created by Fitts and Posner. These men base the stages on the theory created by K. Anders Ericsson. The first stage of the plateau effect is the cognitive stage which means “You’re intellectualizing the task and discovering new strategies to accomplish it more proficiently.” The second stage is the associative stage which means “You’re concentrating less, making fewer major errors, and generally becoming more efficient.” The last and final stage is autonomous stage (aka the plateau effect) which means as “When you figure that you’ve gotten as good as you need to get at the task and you’re basically running on autopilot.” Reaching the final stage of the plateau effect starts the mental exercises to keep the mind guessing.

== The Plateau Effect: Getting From Stuck to Success ==
The Plateau Effect was popularized in application to daily life by Bob Sullivan and Hugh Thompson’s 2013 book The Plateau Effect: Getting From Stuck to Success. The book outlines common causes of plateaus, and the author's findings on how to overcome. According to the authors, the common causes of plateaus include immunity, greedy algorithm, bad timing, flow issues, distorted data, distraction, failing slowly, and perfectionism.

== See also ==
- Learning curve
