= Open Voting Consortium =

The Open Voting Consortium (OVC) is a non-profit advocacy group dedicated to the development, maintenance, and delivery of trustable and open voting systems for use in public elections.

OVC was founded in December 12, 2003 by Alan Dechert, Dr. Arthur Keller and computer science professor Dr. Doug Jones. The purpose of the group is to disseminate information about existing electronic voting systems as well as to develop standards and software to demonstrate the use of off-the-shelf components with an open source election system. The group has developed a proof of concept prototype demonstrating an open voting system. Alan Dechert has testified before the California General Assembly.

== Founding and focus ==
An August 2008, San Francisco Chronicle article says that software engineer Alan Dechert was "outraged" that the results of the 2000 United States presidential election were thrown into confusion "because nobody could figure out how Florida's voters had voted," which convinced him and a few like-minded colleagues to found OVC with the goal of delivering "trustable and open voting systems… In addition to lobbying against proprietary voting machines, they have spent the last several years working with scientists and engineers around the world to design and build a voting machine of their own." Dechert told the newspaper that the OVC voting machine, based on the Linux operating system, could be certified for use by 2010.

Some of the group's early work included developing a system that would not be subject to the perceived security flaws in touch-screen voting machines, including those supplied by Diebold Election Systems (renamed Premier Election Solutions, acquired by Election Systems & Software), by creating a system that would allow voters to use a touchscreen while simultaneously producing a paper record. A 2004 Associated Press article grouped the OVC with the "harshest e-voting critics" and said it was pressuring voting machine companies to publish their software online, which OVC argued would lead to greater voter confidence and expose any flaws. "Open source is the only way to build robust systems that people can believe in," said Ed Cherlin, a software engineer and OVC member. In 2013, SB 360 was signed by Governor Jerry Brown, allowing the state of California to self-certify open source election systems.

== See also ==
- ACCURATE
