= R. Doug Lewis =

R. Doug Lewis has served as Executive Director of the Election Center in Texas, USA, since 1994. The Election Center is a nonprofit also known as the National Association of Election Officials, whose purpose is "to promote, preserve, and improve democracy."

== Early life, education, and career ==
Lewis was born in New Orleans, Louisiana in 1947 and received a B.A. degree from Emporia State University in 1968, majoring in speech.

After graduating, he was the director of public relations at Wichita State University, handling the response to the Wichita State University football team plane crash. In 1975, he was the executive director of the Republican Party of Texas.

In 1978, he was the executive director of the John Connally Citizens Forum, a political action committee for John Connally, with Lewis also working as an aide for Connally until at least 1979.

According to Bev Harris, Lewis ran Micro Trade Mart, a company that resold used computers, between 1986 and June 1993.

Lewis was part of a committee that oversaw the recount of the 1998 election in Hawaii. In 2001, he testified to the United States Senate about voting issues during the 2000 United States elections. His consultation with Congress helped influence the Help America Vote Act.

He retired from the Election Center in 2015.

== Views ==
During the 2000 United States elections, Lewis said that the electoral voting system is inefficient and decentralized by design, as otherwise "it takes a lot of people to steal an election." He predicted that Internet voting would take the form of "controlled access, where you go to a polling site and use a machine that is controlled by government election officials and will then transmit votes across the Internet."

Lewis argued that malware added to a voting system would be discovered during that system's testing, as the malware would not "compile right." This assertion was disputed by Harris and Farhad Manjoo of Salon.

In a 2003 report, Lewis stated that "well-intentioned people, some of them even highly educated and respected, scare voters and public officials with claims that the voting equipment and/or its software can be manipulated to change the outcome of elections."

During the aftermath of the 2016 United States presidential election, Lewis denied that the electoral process was fraudulent in the United States. He said that people and groups have collected alleged instances of electoral fraud, but when "they have to name names ... almost always the allegations go away".

== Current positions ==
- Executive Director of the Election Center
- Election Assistance Commission Board of Advisors
- electionline.org Advisory Board
- Director of the Voting Systems Program for the National Association of State Election Directors (NASED)
- Member of the national Voting Systems Board and the California Internet Voting Advisory Committee

== Testimony ==
- Testimony presented to the United States Election Assistance Commission Public Meeting, December 7, 2006
- Statement presented to the United States Election Assistance Commission Public Hearing, June 3, 2004
- Testimony for U.S. Senate Hearings On Disasters and Special Elections Senate Judiciary Committee Subcommittee on Constitution, September 9, 2003
- Testimony before the California Secretary of State's Ad Hoc Committee on Voter Verified Paper Ballots
- Testimony for Senate Government Affairs Committee, May 9, 2001
