= Simon Ardizzone =

American filmmaker

- Occupation: Television

Simon Nicholas Knight Ardizzone is an editor and filmmaker. He produced and co-directed the documentary Hacking Democracy with Russell Michaels (2006) and co-directed Kill Chain: The Cyber War on America's Elections (2020) with Russell Michaels and Sarah Teale. He was an editor on the TV documentaries: God Is Green (2007); Britain's Greatest Monarch (2005); and What Made Mozart Tic (2004).

Ardizzone studied at Durham University. He later graduated from the National Film and Television School in 1995.
