= Bob Sullivan (journalist) =

- Born: Woodbridge, New Jersey, U.S.
- Education: Fairfield University; Missouri School of Journalism
- Writing career
- Subjects: Consumer advocate Cybercrime/fraud
- Notable works: Stop Getting Ripped Off; Gotcha Capitalism; Red Tape Chronicles
- Website: bobsullivan.net

Bob Sullivan (born 1968 in Wood-Ridge, New Jersey) is an American online journalist, author and one of the founding members of msnbc.com. Sullivan is the author of two New York Times Bestsellers entitled Stop Getting Ripped Off and Gotcha Capitalism. Sullivan is a journalist at BobSullivan.net and an author. Formerly, he was senior writer, technology correspondent and author of the popular blog, The Red Tape Chronicles, at msnbc.com, where he focused on technology crime and consumer fraud. He also regularly appears on air on MSNBC, CNBC's On the Money, NBC Nightly News, the Today show, and various local NBC affiliates.

== Education ==
Sullivan received his B.A. in history and mathematics from Fairfield University in 1990. He received an M.A. in Journalism from the Missouri School of Journalism in 1996.

== Career ==
Sullivan has been reporting on computer crime, electronic financial fraud, privacy, and the Internet Underground and has written more than 100 articles on the subjects since 1996.

Sullivan was the first to report to Americans that the FBI had developed a computer program, called Magic Lantern, designed to obtain public encryption keys on November 20, 2001. He was also the first to describe the data theft at ChoicePoint, the first of what would become an avalanche of stories about stolen and lost personal information on February 18, 2005.

Sullivan is the recipient of several journalism awards. In 2002, Sullivan won the prestigious Society of Professional Journalists Public Service Award for his series of articles on online fraud. In 2003, he received the Carnegie Mellon University CyLab CyberSecurity Journalism Award for his online cybersecurity reporting. More recently, in 2016, Sullivan accepted the Betty Furness Consumer Media Service Award from the Consumer Federation of America in recognition of his two decades writing and speaking "critically about anti-consumer practices both through major news outlets and a series of books."

== Bibliography ==
- Bob Sullivan and Herbert Hugh Thompson. Getting Unstuck: Break Free of the Plateau Effect. Penguin, 2014. (ISBN 0698183819)
- Bob Sullivan and Herbert Hugh Thompson. The Plateau Effect: Getting from Stuck to Success. Penguin, 2013. (ISBN 1101624248)
- Bob Sullivan. Stop Getting Ripped Off: Why Consumers Get Screwed, and How You Can Always Get a Fair Deal. Ballantine Books, 2009. (ISBN 978-0-345-51159-1)
- Bob Sullivan. Gotcha Capitalism: How Hidden Fees Rip You Off Every Day-and What You Can Do About It. Ballantine Books, 2007. (ISBN 978-0-345-49613-3)
- Bob Sullivan. Your Evil Twin: Behind the Identity Theft Epidemic. John Wiley & Sons, 2004. (ISBN 978-0-471-64810-9)
