= Ballot Browser =

Ballot county program

Ballot Browser is open source ballot counting software developed initially for the Humboldt County (California) Election Transparency Project. In November 2008, counting performed with Ballot Browser revealed a bug in Premier Election Solutions' (formerly Diebold Election Systems) GEMS tabulation software. Subsequent investigation by the California Secretary of State led to the decertification of the GEMS version used in Humboldt County.

Ballot Browser was developed by Mitch Trachtenberg and was available, free, from http://www.tevsystems.com.

== Source code ==
As of April 2024 while the domain tevsystems.com is still maintained, there appear to be no IP addresses associated with the domain so the site is unreachable. As of April 2024 the software itself remains available from SourceForge via a cvs repository.

The Wayback Machine shows that www.tevsystems.com was active until at least 9 August 2014. By the next poll on 18 December 2014, the site had been replaced by a banner message directing those interested in TEVS to email Mitch Trachtenberg.

All three "Downloads" links on 9 August 2014 version of the page redirect to the TEVS code repository, which as of April 2024 still exists on the Google code archive, and records that it was created on the 21st March 2011. That page indicates that the project has been renamed to "TEVS":

"TEVS, the Trachtenberg Election Verification System, is an outgrowth of the Humboldt County Election Transparency Project."

== Licensing ==
While the Ballot Browser project page declares the license as "GNU General Public License version 2.0 (GPLv2)", the source code itself reports the license as "version 3 of the GNU General Public License." throughout, and includes the full text of version 3 of the GPL within the source file: HelpMessages.py.
