= Walden O'Dell =

American businessman

Walden "Wally" O'Dell is the former chief executive officer and former chairman of the board of Diebold, a US-based security and financial products company.

He was an active fundraiser for George W. Bush's re-election campaign and wrote in a fund-raising letter dated August 13, 2003, that he was committed "to helping Ohio deliver its electoral votes to the President." His involvement with the campaign raised concerns that, as the CEO of the largest manufacturer of electronic voting equipment, he would have been in a position to attempt to manipulate the results of the presidential election of 2004.

In December 2005, O'Dell left the company amid a United States Securities and Exchange Commission (SEC) investigation into insider trading at the company.

O'Dell holds both a bachelor's and a master's degree in electrical engineering from Saint Louis University, and an M.B.A. from Stanford University. He is a member of the Board of Trustees of Ohio State University.

== See also ==
- 2004 United States election voting controversies
- Hacking Democracy
