= Douglas W. Jones =

American computer scientist

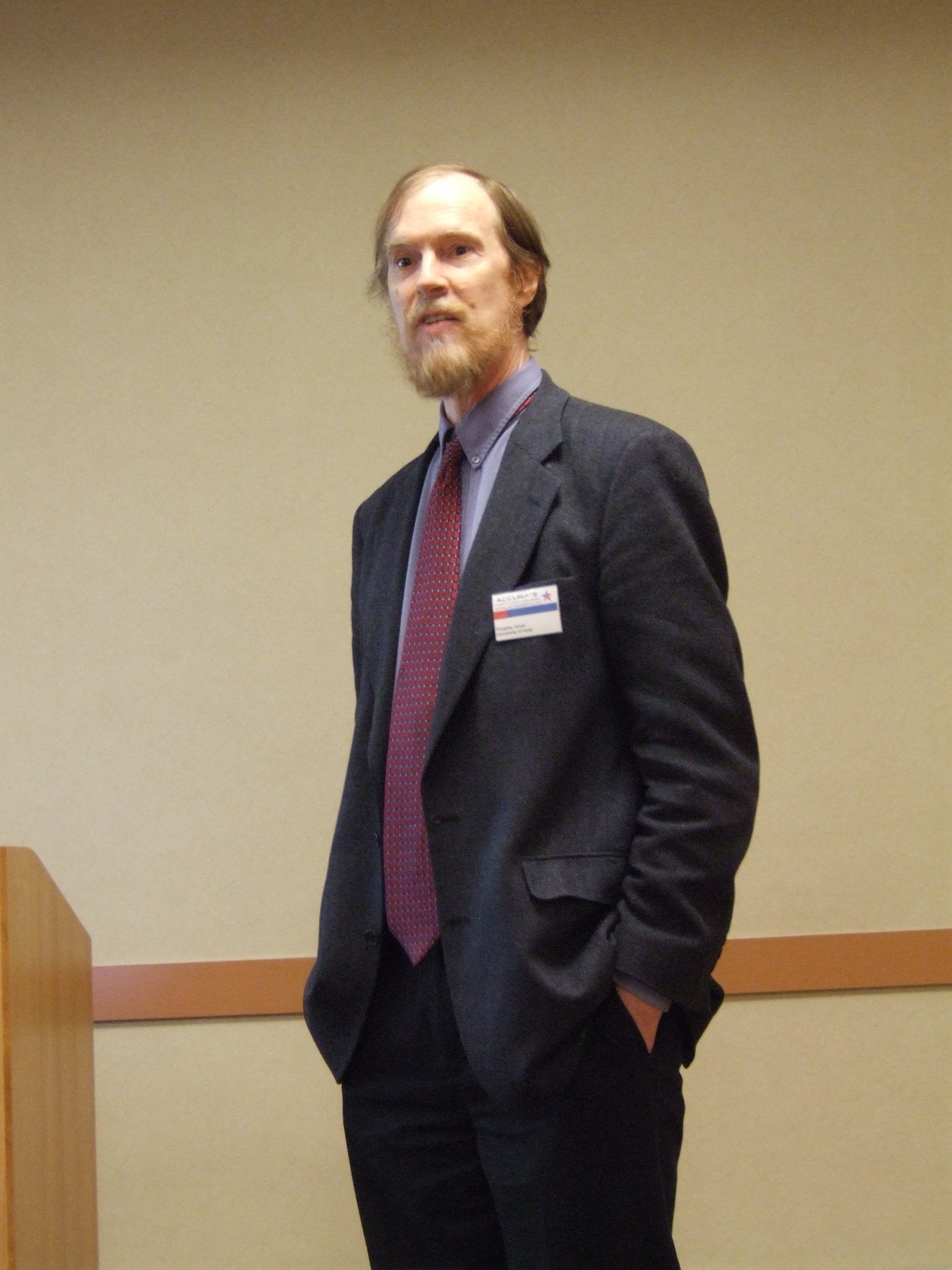
- Born: Douglas Warren Jones
- Occupations: University professor, computer scientist
- Scientific career
- Education: Carnegie Mellon University BS; University of Illinois at Urbana-Champaign MS, PhD
- Known for: computer security, electronic voting
- Awards: Phi Kappa Phi, Tau Beta Pi
- Fields: Computer science
- Workplaces: University of Iowa (1980–present)
- Thesis: The Systematic Design of a Protection Mechanism to Support a High Level Language (1980)
- Doctoral advisor: Thomas T. Chen
- Website: divms.cs.uiowa.edu/~dwjones/
- Writing career
- Years active: 2005–2013 (Science Fiction)
- Genre: Science fiction
- Notable work: 1632 series short stories

Douglas W. Jones is an American computer scientist at the University of Iowa. His research focuses primarily on computer security, particularly electronic voting.

Jones received a B.S. in physics from Carnegie Mellon University in 1973, and a M.S. and Ph.D. in computer science from the University of Illinois at Urbana-Champaign in 1976 and 1980 respectively.

Jones' involvement with electronic voting research began in 1994, when he was appointed to the Iowa Board of Examiners for Voting Machines and Electronic Voting Systems. He chaired the board from 1999 to 2003, and has testified before the United States Commission on Civil Rights, the United States House Committee on Science and the Federal Election Commission on voting issues. In 2005 he participated as an election observer for the presidential election in Kazakhstan. Jones was the technical advisor for HBO's documentary on electronic voting machine issues, "Hacking Democracy", that was released in 2006. He was a member of the ACCURATE electronic voting project from 2005 to 2011. On December 11, 2009, the Election Assistance Commission appointed Douglas Jones to the Technical Guidelines Development Committee.

Together with Barbara Simons, Jones has published a book on electronic voting entitled Broken Ballots: Will Your Vote Count? Jones's most widely cited work centers on the evaluation of priority queue implementations. This work has been credited with helping relaunch the empirical study of algorithm performance. In related work, Jones applied splay trees to data compression and developed algorithms for applying parallel computing to discrete event simulation. Jones's PhD thesis was in the area of capability-based addressing, and he has occasionally published on other aspects of computer architecture. He has published work on computer architecture on an occasional basis, such as his proposal for a one-instruction set computer.
