= Kill Chain: The Cyber War on America's Elections =

2020 HBO documentary film

- Film poster
- Directed by: Simon Ardizzone; Russell Michaels; Sarah Teale
- Narrated by: Harri Hursti
- Country of origin: United States
- Original language: English

Production
- Producers: Simon Ardizzone; Russell Michaels; Sarah Teale; Michael Hirschorn; Jessica Antonini
- Cinematography: Matt Porwoll
- Editors: Simon Ardizzone; Phillip Schopper
- Running time: 91 minutes
- Production companies: Blumhouse Television; HBO Documentary Films; Ish Entertainment

Original release
- Release: March 26, 2020

Kill Chain: The Cyber War on America's Elections is an American television documentary film produced by Ish Entertainment, Blumhouse Television and HBO Documentary Films. The film examines the American election system and its vulnerabilities to foreign cyberwarfare operations and 2016 presidential election interference. The film also features hackers at the conference DEF CON in their attempts to test the security of electronic voting machines.

The film was released on March 26, 2020, by HBO Documentary Films.

In 2021 the film was nominated for an Emmy award for Outstanding Investigative Documentary.

The film reveals the hacking attack on the presidential election in 2016, through the exclusive on-camera interview with the hacker known as CyberZeist. CyberZeist penetrated the Alaska Division Of Elections' state vote tabulation computer system on 6 and 7 November 2016, and on election day, 8 November 2016. CyberZeist successfully achieved this attack only weeks after the Alaska Division Of Elections admitted that Russian hackers had attempted to carry out a comparable attack.

The film's world famous elections cybersecurity expert, Harri Hursti, discovered that most hackers install a range of software that will be hidden in multiple components of a computer, so that even wiping the hard drive will not remove the hackers’ access. CyberZeist told him, “I’ll go under their radar even if they are 24/7 monitoring it [the vote-counting server].” When reviewing the hack on the Alaska Division of Elections’ servers, Hursti discovered that CyberZeist could read or write any file, including system files: In other words, CyberZeist could have planted vote-stealing software that might still be there, waiting for a command to activate. As Hursti showed in Kill Chain, threat-actors might not even be looking to change results in an election, but to sabotage democracy and bring the process into disrepute.

== See also ==
- Hacking Democracy – 2006 film by Simon Ardizzone

== Reviews ==
- Meanwhile A Deeper Danger Than The Pandemic - Forbes.com review of Kill Chain: The Cyber War on America's Elections
