= Hacking Democracy =

2006 film by Simon Ardizzone

- The controversial electronic voting documentary
- Directed by: Simon Ardizzone; Russell Michaels
- Produced by: Robert Carrillo Cohen; Simon Ardizzone; Russell Michaels
- Starring: Bev Harris; Kathleen Wynne; Andy Stephenson; Harri Hursti; Herbert Hugh Thompson; Ion Sancho
- Release date: November 2, 2006
- Running time: 82 minutes
- Country: United States
- Language: English

Hacking Democracy is a 2006 Emmy nominated documentary film broadcast on HBO and created by producer Robert Carrillo Cohen with producer / directors Russell Michaels and Simon Ardizzone, and executive producers Sarah Teale, Sian Edwards & Earl Katz. Filmed over three years it documents American citizens investigating anomalies and irregularities with electronic voting systems that occurred during the 2000 and 2004 elections in the United States, especially in Volusia County, Florida.

The film investigates the flawed integrity of electronic voting machines, particularly those made by Diebold Election Systems, exposing previously unknown backdoors in the Diebold trade secret computer software. The film culminates dramatically in the on-camera hacking of the in-use / working Diebold election system in Leon County, Florida - the same computer voting system which has been used in actual American elections across thirty-three states, and which still counts tens of millions of America's votes today.

In 2007 Hacking Democracy was nominated for an Emmy award for Outstanding Investigative Journalism – Long Form.

== Demonstrated flaws ==
The documentary follows Bev Harris and Kathleen Wynne, director and associate director for nonprofit election watchdog group Black Box Voting, as they attempt to discover the extent to which it would be possible to alter results on the electronic voting machines of Diebold Election Systems (now Premier Election Solutions). Andy Stephenson, an employee of Black Box Voting from July–December 2004, assisted with comparisons of audit documents in Volusia County and obtained a secret videotape of Harris interviewing a voting machine testing lab. Kathleen Wynne captured live video of Harris finding voting machine records in a Volusia County trash bag, and captured video of Cuyahoga County, Ohio elections workers admitting that the initial 3% recount ballots had not been randomly selected during the 2004 presidential election. Harris and Wynne then embarked on a series of five voting machine hack tests with Dr. Herbert Hugh Thompson and Harri Hursti in 2005 and 2006. During the course of the documentary, multiple methods of tampering with the votes are shown.

The first is through editing the database file that contains the voting totals. This file is a standard Microsoft Access database, and can be opened by normal means outside of the encompassing voting program without a password. Some jurisdictions have disabled Microsoft Access, making it more difficult to alter the database, but this protection was shown to be bypassed by Dr. Herbert Hugh Thompson through a Visual Basic program which searched for a string of text and edited the file through external means. However, alterations of the results in either of these fashions would be caught if a vigilant elections official compared the results with voting machine tapes.

Another hacking technique was demonstrated through hacking the actual computer code used in the Diebold Accu-Vote memory cards. This method was discovered by Finnish computer security expert Harri Hursti and is known as "the Hursti Hack". In this hack, Harri Hursti rigged the Diebold optical scan voting system to make the wrong candidate win by adding negative (minus) votes to one race. This resulted in that race having votes literally subtracted from its vote total. These methods were tested by the Leon County Supervisor of Elections, Ion Sancho, on the actual Diebold optical scan voting system used by Tallahassee, Florida in all their prior elections. This method demonstrated, contrary to a previous Diebold statement, that a person attempting to rig the votes of a precinct would need access to only the memory card, not the optical scan voting system or tabulation software. This method, when cross-checked between the optical scan voting system and tabulation software, perfectly mimics a legitimate result, and further makes the voting machine produce a false zero-vote print-out, falsely confirming that the memory card has no votes inside it before voting begins. Following this historic hack Ion Sancho stated: "If I had not known what was behind this I would have certified this election as a true count of the votes."

== Reaction ==
Even though no one from Diebold Election Systems admitted to having seen the film, Diebold President David Byrd suggested that Hacking Democracy was "replete with material examples of inaccurate reporting", and demanded that it not be aired. His criticism was based on an earlier film made by the same three filmmakers. However, HBO refused to remove it from their schedules. In addition Diebold wrote a letter to HBO referring to the famous vote changing 'Hursti Hack' featured in the film, claiming that "Harri Hursti is shown attacking a Diebold machine in Florida. But his attack proved later to be a complete sham." This statement by Diebold was proven to be wholly wrong by independent computer scientists at UC Berkeley who investigated the Hursti Hack.

California's Secretary of State commissioned a Special Report by scientists at UC Berkeley to investigate the Hursti Hack. Page 2 of their report states:

Harri Hursti's attack does work: Mr. Hursti's attack on the AV-OS is definitely real. He was indeed able to change the election results by doing nothing more than modifying the contents of a memory card. He needed no passwords, no cryptographic keys, and no access to any other part of the voting system, including the GEMS election management server.

One of Diebold's objections to the film was that it failed to mention that Avi Rubin, a Johns Hopkins computer science professor and vocal Diebold critic, may have a conflict of interest. Rubin at one point owned stock options in VoteHere, which sells auditing software and systems for voting machines. However, Rubin disposed of his stock options and withdrew from the VoteHere advisory board in August 2003, and says he had not had any meaningful contact since joining over two years before, except occasionally receiving press clippings.

== DVD release and online movie ==
The film was released on DVD on March 20, 2007. It includes deleted scenes, a trailer and director biographies.

Hacking Democracy was published for online viewing on Amazon Instant Video on 30 September 2016. Also the film is available to view on Vimeo On Demand.

== Sequel ==
In March 2020, HBO and Hacking Democracy directors / producers Simon Ardizzone, Russell Michaels and Sarah Teale released the follow-up film, Kill Chain: The Cyber War on America's Elections. In 2021 this sequel was nominated for an Emmy award for Outstanding Investigative Documentary. The film was also produced by Michael Hirschorn and Jessica Antonini.

The film reveals the hacking attack on the presidential election in 2016, through the exclusive on-camera interview with the hacker known as CyberZeist. CyberZeist penetrated the Alaska Division Of Elections' state vote tabulation computer system on 6 and 7 November 2016, and on election day, 8 November 2016. CyberZeist successfully achieved this attack only weeks after the Alaska Division Of Elections admitted that Russian hackers had attempted to carry out a comparable attack.

The film's elections cybersecurity expert, Harri Hursti, discovered that most hackers install a range of software that will be hidden in multiple components of a computer, so that even wiping the hard drive will not remove the hackers’ access. CyberZeist told him, “I’ll go under their radar even if they are 24/7 monitoring it [the vote-counting server].” When reviewing the hack on the Alaska Division of Elections’ servers, Hursti discovered that CyberZeist could read or write any file, including system files: In other words, CyberZeist could have planted vote-stealing software that might still be there, waiting for a command to activate. As Hursti showed in Kill Chain, threat-actors might not even be looking to change results in an election, but to sabotage democracy and bring the process into disrepute.

== See also ==
- 2004 United States election voting controversies
- Electoral fraud: Tampering with electronic voting systems
- Black Box Voting
