= Sequoia Voting Systems =

EVM company

Sequoia Voting Systems was a California-based company that was one of the largest providers of electronic voting systems in the U.S., having offices in Oakland, Denver and New York City. Some of its major competitors were Premier Election Solutions (formerly Diebold Election Systems) and Election Systems & Software.

On 8 March 2005, Sequoia was acquired by Smartmatic, founded by three Venezuelan software engineers. In November 2007, following a verdict by the Committee on Foreign Investment in the United States (CFIUS), Smartmatic was ordered to sell Sequoia, which it did to its Sequoia managers having U.S. citizenship.

On 4 June 2010, certain assets were acquired by the Canadian company Dominion Voting Systems . At the time it had contracts for 300 jurisdictions in 16 states through its BPS, WinEDS, Edge, Edge2, Advantage, Insight, InsightPlus and 400C systems.

In February 2014, Sequoia filed a bankruptcy petition under Chapter 11 of the bankruptcy code.

== History ==
Sequoia Voting Systems began as Mathematical Systems Corporation of Anaheim, California, the developers of a punched-card voting system that served as an alternative to the Votomatic. Some time around 1970, Diamond National Corporation (the holding company that grew from the Diamond Match Company) acquired the company. In the 1970s, Diamond National became Diamond International, which was acquired and reorganized by Jefferson Smurfit, an Irish printing conglomerate, producing Smurfit Diamond Packaging Corporation. Diamond spun off its punched-card voting business in 1983 as Sequoia Pacific Systems Corporation.

In 1984, Sequoia purchased the voting machine business of AVM Corporation (the former Automatic Voting Machine Corporation) and was reorganized as Sequoia Voting Systems. AVM had its roots in a number of voting machine companies founded in the 1890s, but by the 1980s, most of its business was in other fields. Nonetheless, in the late 1950s, AVM had begun investing in the development of electronic voting machines. By the time Sequoia bought the AVM voting business, the AVM Automatic Voting Computer (AVC) was ready for market. Under Sequoia ownership, the AVC was certified for use in several states in 1986 and 1987, and with sleek new packaging, it went to market as the Sequoia AVC Advantage DRE voting machine in 1990. Business Week considered the AVC Advantage to be one of the high points in industrial design for the decade of the 1990s and credited it with turning the company around.

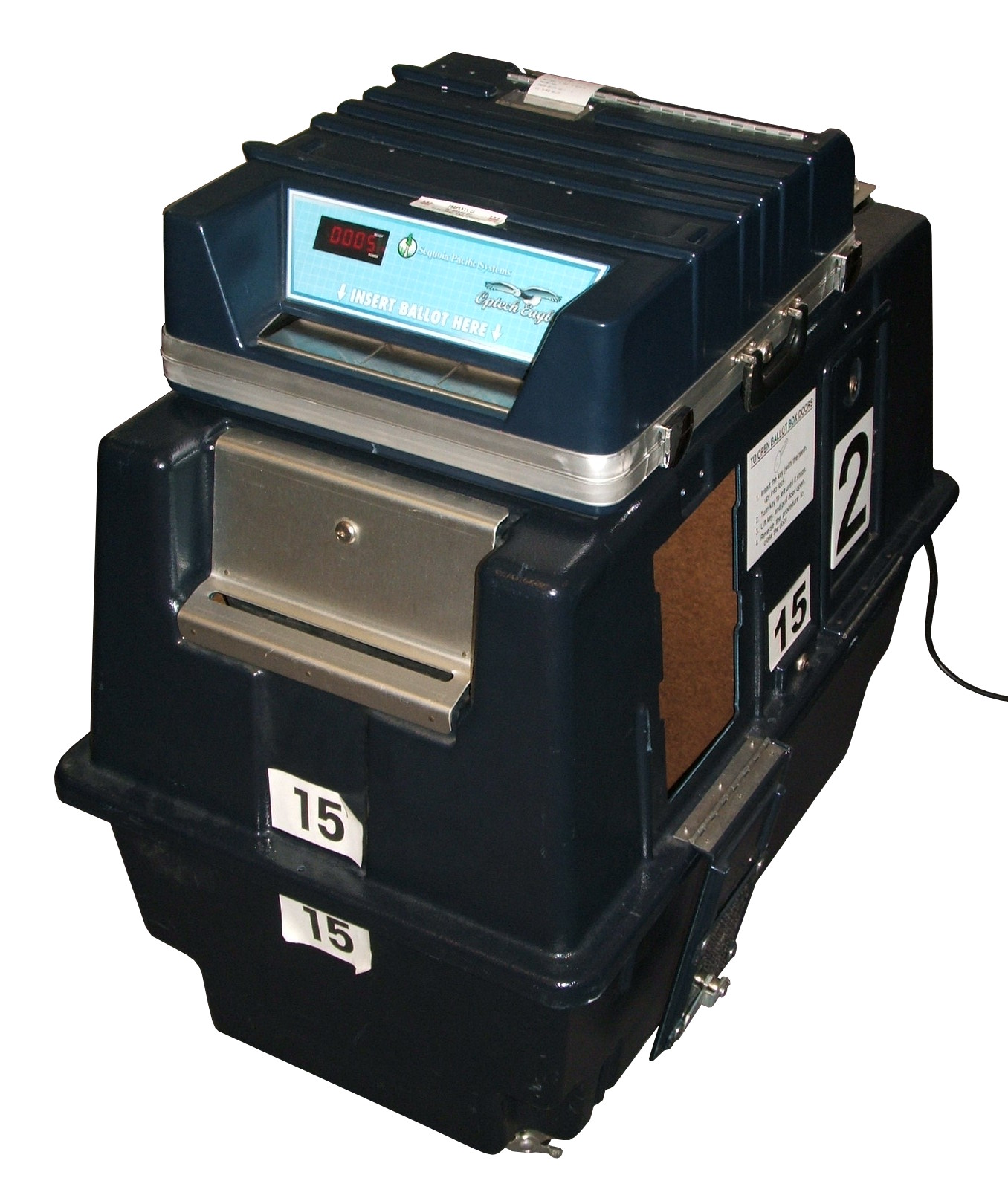
An Optech Eagle voting machine made after Sequoia Voting Systems obtained the rights from Business Records Corporation

In late 1997, Sequoia obtained the intellectual property rights to the Optech line of ballot scanners from Business Records Corporation. This transfer was a consequence of antitrust action taken by the United States Department of Justice when American Information Systems merged with the Election Services Division of Business Records Corporation to form Election Systems & Software. After this merger ES&S retained the right to sell and service Optech scanners to existing customers; as a result, the ES&S Optech IV-C and the Sequoia Optech 400-C, for example, are essentially the same device.

In early 2002 De La Rue, a British currency paper printing and security company took over ownership from Smurfit for $23 million. After losing money for several years, on March 8, 2005, Sequoia was acquired by Smartmatic, a multi-national technology company founded by three Venezuelan software engineers, which had developed advanced election systems, including voting machines. Smartmatic machines and software were used in the 2004 Venezuelan recall referendum, which resulted in two studies, an exit poll and cluster analysis, indicating "massive fraud" that flipped the result in favor of dictator Hugo Chávez.

In November 2007, following a verdict by the Committee on Foreign Investment in the United States (CFIUS), Smartmatic was ordered to sell Sequoia, which it did to its Sequoia managers having U.S. citizenship.

== Controversies ==
=== California decertification/recertification ===
On August 3, 2007, California Secretary of State Debra Bowen withdrew approval and granted conditional reapproval to Sequoia Voting Systems optical scan and DRE voting machines after a "review of the voting machines certified for use in California in March 2007" found "significant security weaknesses throughout the Sequoia system" and "pervasive structural weaknesses" which raise "serious questions as to whether the Sequoia software can be relied upon to protect the integrity of elections."

=== "Hanging chads" controversy ===
A 2007 investigative report by Dan Rather charged Sequoia with deliberately supplying poor quality punch-card ballots to Palm Beach County, Florida, for the 2000 election. According to former Sequoia employees, the ballots for Palm Beach County were produced with paper and manufacturing processes that were outside of normal specifications. This supposedly caused all of the problems with "hanging chads". When quality problems were found, Sequoia management ordered the production workers to ignore them. One worker speculated that the object was to discredit punch-card ballots and thus promote sales of electronic voting machines.

=== Florida touch-screen replacement ===
After the 2000 election problems, Florida required its counties to replace punch-card voting systems with touch-screen systems, some of which were purchased from Sequoia. However, there were some major problems with touch-screen systems, and in 2007 Florida ordered the counties to replace them with optical-scan systems by July 1, 2008. Sequoia offered to buy back its machines for $1 each. This offer was rejected.

=== Threat of legal action against Professor Edward Felten ===
In early 2008, New Jersey election officials announced that they planned to send one or more Sequoia Advantage voting machines to Professors Edward Felten and Andrew Appel of Princeton University for analysis. Felten and Appel are computer scientists interested in security issues, especially in regard to electronic voting systems. In March 2008, Sequoia sent an e-mail to Professor Felten asserting that allowing him to examine Sequoia voting machines would violate the license agreement between Sequoia and the county which bought them, and also that Sequoia would take legal action "to stop... non-compliant analysis... publication of Sequoia software... or any other infringement of our intellectual property." This action sparked outrage among computer technology activists. Author and digital rights activist Cory Doctorow commented "It's hard to imagine a stupider legal threat."

Shortly after this, Sequoia's corporate Web site was hacked. The hack was first discovered by Ed Felten. Sequoia took its Web site down on March 20 and removed the "intrusive content".

=== The Avante Lawsuit ===
In June 2006, Sequoia Voting Systems, along with Diebold and ES&S, were sued by a small, virtually unknown New Jersey technology company called 'Avante', alleging infringement of two of its patents covering DREs (Direct Recording Electronic voting machines) and Optical Scanners. The lawsuit demands that the three companies

a) are prohibited permanently to sell all their "infringing" equipment;

b) recall all "infringing" equipment;

c) destroy or deliver to Avante the "infringing" equipment;

d) award "infringement" damages to Avante including treble damages for "willful infringement".

Sequoia Voting Systems, in particular, was sued for its Edge, Advantage, 400C, VeriVote Printer (VVPAT) and Insight machines (that is, for all of its products except one). The other two companies were sued for almost all of their products.

=== Smartmatic's continuing interests in Sequoia ===
On August 26, 2005, Sequoia Voting Systems announced that Mr. Jack Blaine would serve in the dual role as President of Sequoia Voting Systems and President of Sequoia's parent company, Smartmatic.

In April 2008, competitor Hart InterCivic attempted a hostile takeover of Sequoia. Court documents unearthed at this time revealed that Smartmatic still retained some financial control over several aspects of Sequoia. At the time, Smartmatic held a $2 million note from SVS Holdings, Inc., the management team which purchased the company from Smartmatic. In accordance to the acquisition contract, Smartmatic also retains ownership of intellectual property rights for some of Sequoia's currently deployed election products in the United States, and holds the right to negotiate overseas non-compete agreements.

Among other bidders, Smartmatic and Sequoia were competitors for the contract to provide voting machines and services to the 2010 national elections in the Philippines, one of the largest contracts ever in the voting technology industry. In the bidding process Sequoia was disqualified early, while Smartmatic was declared the winner.

=== Acquisition by Dominion Voting Systems ===
On June 4, 2010, Dominion Voting Systems, a Canadian company engaged in manufacturing electronic voting hardware and optical scanners, acquired all physical and intellectual assets of Sequoia Voting Systems as well as retained technical and sales staff.

== See also ==
- 2004 United States election voting controversies
- Venezuelan recall referendum of 2004
