= ACCURATE =

ACCURATE (A Center for Correct, Usable, Reliable, Auditable, and Transparent Elections) was established in 2005 by a group of computer scientists, psychologists and policy experts to address problems with electronic voting. The organization was funded by National Science Foundation (NSF) through 2012, and published research and reference materials about electronic voting for use by policy makers, vendors, the elections community and the general public.

== See also ==
- Avi Rubin
- Peter G. Neumann
- David A. Wagner
- Douglas W. Jones
- Voting machine
