= Veikko Hursti =

Finnish philanthropist

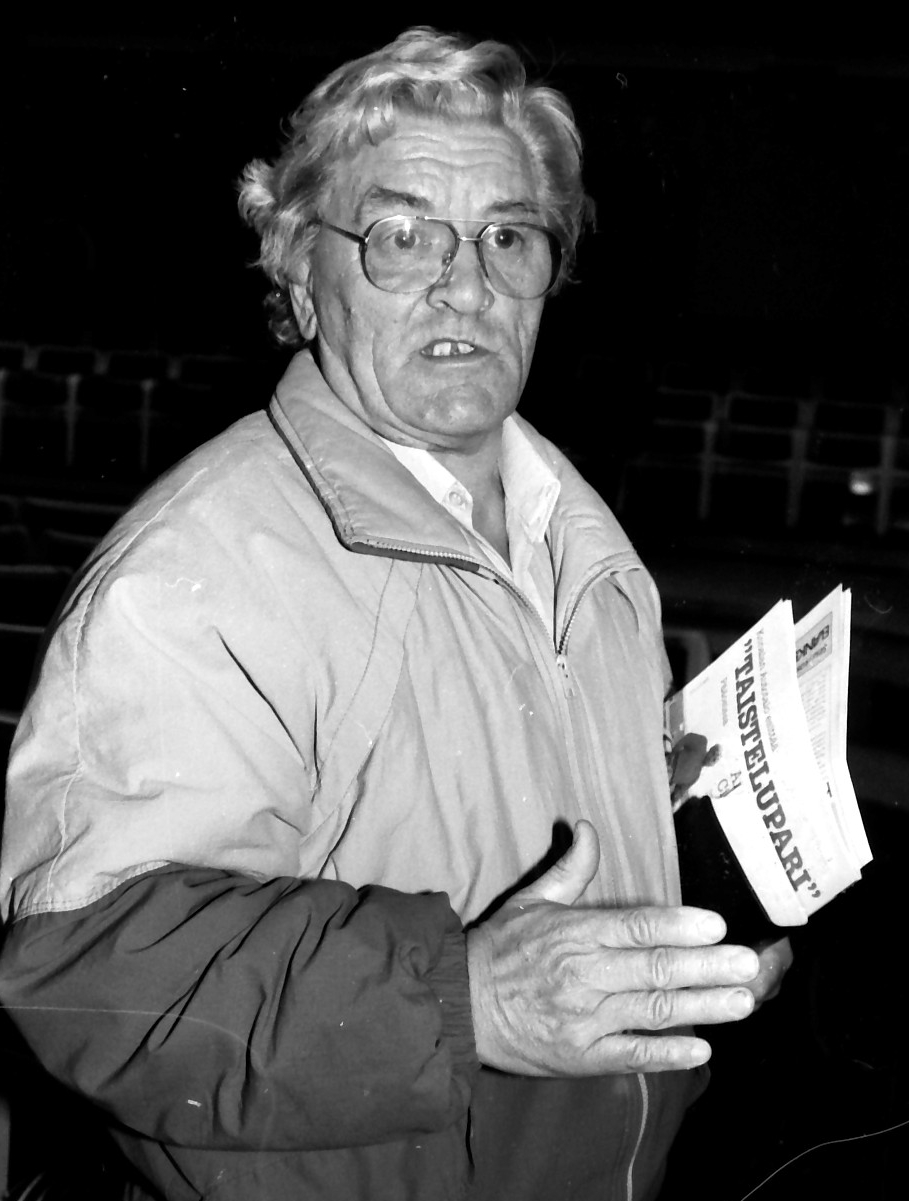
Hursti in 1987

Veikko Stefanus Hursti (25 November 1924 – 10 May 2005) was a Finnish philanthropist. He lived in Helsinki. Hursti is best known for his work in helping the poor and the homeless.

Hursti was from a family of seven children. His mother, maths teacher Elli Hursti (née Heiskanen), was a devout Christian and his father, Arvo Hursti, a Methodist priest who helped street youth in Helsinki.

At age 13, Hursti was admitted to Taideteollisuuskeskuskoulu (today Aalto University School of Arts, Design and Architecture). He volunteered to serve in the Continuation War for two years and later worked as a commercial artist, singer and circus performer. In 1949 he married. The family lost their home due to Hursti's alcohol use and the children were taken into care for some time.

In the late 1960s Hursti became religious and started to do mission work and also charity work for the disadvantaged. He became nationally known for hosting a yearly Christmas party for the poor. Hursti and his wife Lahja Hursti (née Miettinen) were awarded the Medal for Humane Benevolence (Pro Benignitate Humana) by president Mauno Koivisto.

Veikko and Lahja Hursti had six children, one of whom continued the charity work.
