= Harri Hursti =

Finnish computer programmer

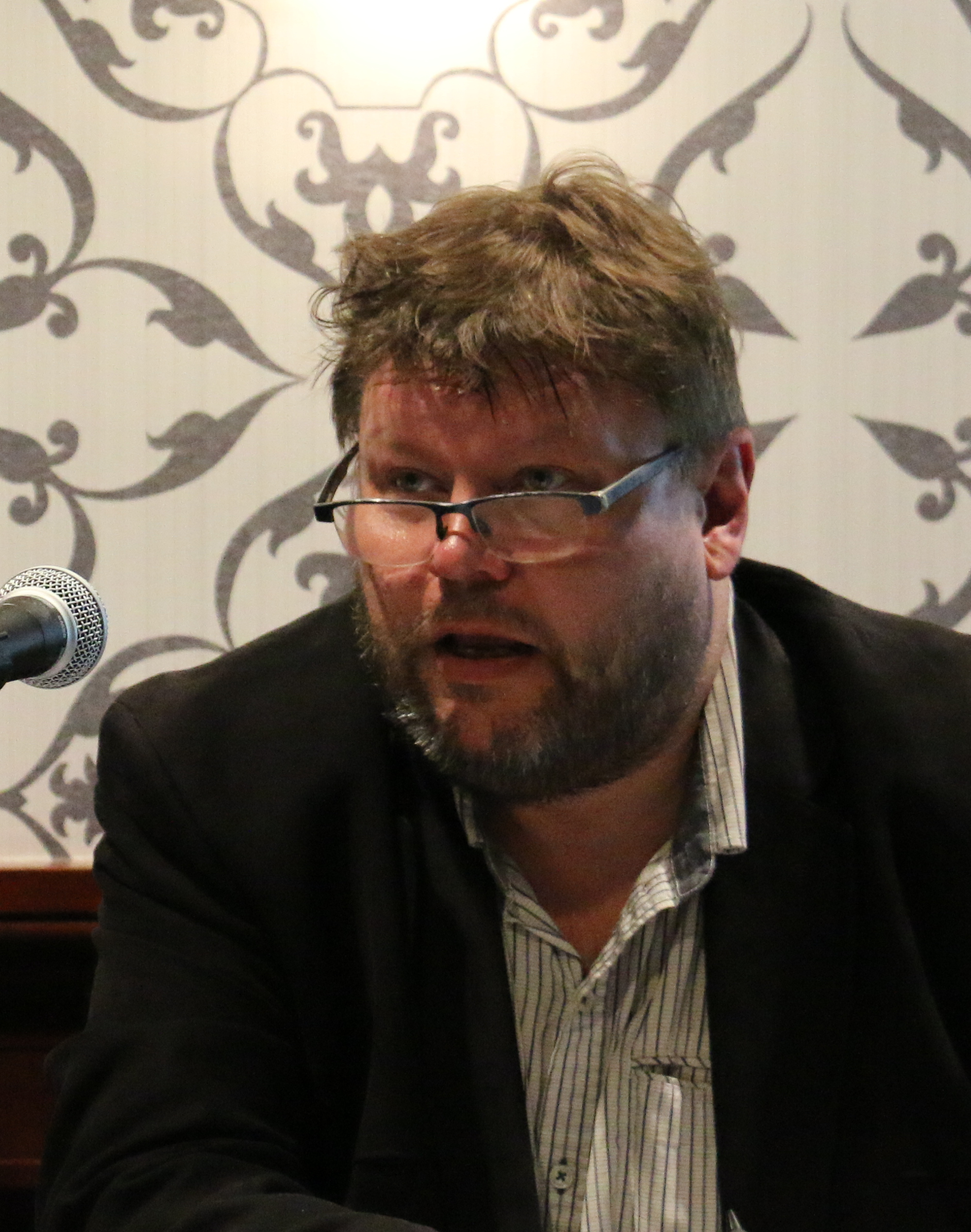
- Hursti in 2018
- Born: 10 July 1968 (age 57); Helsinki, Finland
- Occupation: Chief technical officer
- Relatives: Veikko Hursti (uncle)

Harri Harras Hursti (born 10 July 1968 in Helsinki, Finland) is a Finnish computer programmer and former chairman of the board and co-founder of ROMmon, where he supervised in the development of the world's smallest 2-gigabit traffic analysis product that was later acquired by F-Secure Corporation.

== Career ==
Hursti participates in the Black Box Voting hack studies, along with Dr. Herbert "Hugh" Thompson. The memory card hack demonstrated in Leon County is popularly known as "the Hursti Hack". This hack was part of a series of four voting machine hacking tests organized by the nonprofit election watchdog group Black Box Voting in collaboration with the producers of HBO documentary Hacking Democracy (2006). The studies demonstrated serious security flaws in the voting systems of Diebold Election Systems. Hursti also appeared in the HBO documentary Kill Chain: The Cyber War on America's Elections (2020).

When Mike Lindell held a three-day "Cyber Symposium" in August 2021, with a promise that he would present "irrefutable evidence" of election fraud in the 2020 United States presidential election, Hursti, who attended the conference with journalist Donie O'Sullivan, said that Lindell's purported evidence was a "pile of nothing" and found no proof of election fraud.

== Personal life ==
Hursti has lived in the United States since 2009.

== Awards ==
Hursti received the EFF Pioneer Award in October 2009 with Limor "Ladyada" Fried and Carl Malamud.
