= Election Systems & Software =

Voting machine manufacturer in Nebraska, US

- Election Systems & Software logo
- Type: Voting machine manufacture
- Founded: August 1979; 47 years ago Omaha, Nebraska, U.S.
- Headquarters: Omaha, Nebraska, U.S.
- Number of employees: 450+ (as of 2014)
- Website: essvote.com

Election Systems & Software (ES&S or ESS) is an Omaha, Nebraska-based company that manufactures and sells voting machine equipment and services. The company's offerings include vote tabulators, DRE voting machines, voter registration and election management systems, ballot-marking devices, electronic poll books, ballot on demand printing services, and absentee voting-by-mail services.

In 2014, ES&S was the largest manufacturer of voting machines in the United States, claiming customers in 4,500 localities in 42 states and two U.S. territories. As of 2014, the company had more than 450 employees, over 200 of whom are located in its Omaha headquarters.

In 2014, ES&S claimed that "in the past decade alone," it had installed more than 260,000 voting systems, more than 15,000 electronic poll books, and provided services to more than 75,000 elections. The company has installed statewide voting systems in Alabama, Arkansas, Delaware, Georgia, Idaho, Iowa, Maine, Maryland, Minnesota, Mississippi, Montana, Nebraska, New Mexico, North Carolina, North Dakota, Rhode Island, South Carolina, South Dakota, Virginia, and West Virginia. As of 2019 ES&S claimed a U.S. market share of more than 60 percent in customer voting system installations.

The company maintains ten facilities in the United States, two field offices in Canada located in Pickering, Ontario and Vancouver, British Columbia, and a warehouse in Jackson, Mississippi.

== History ==
=== American Information Systems ===
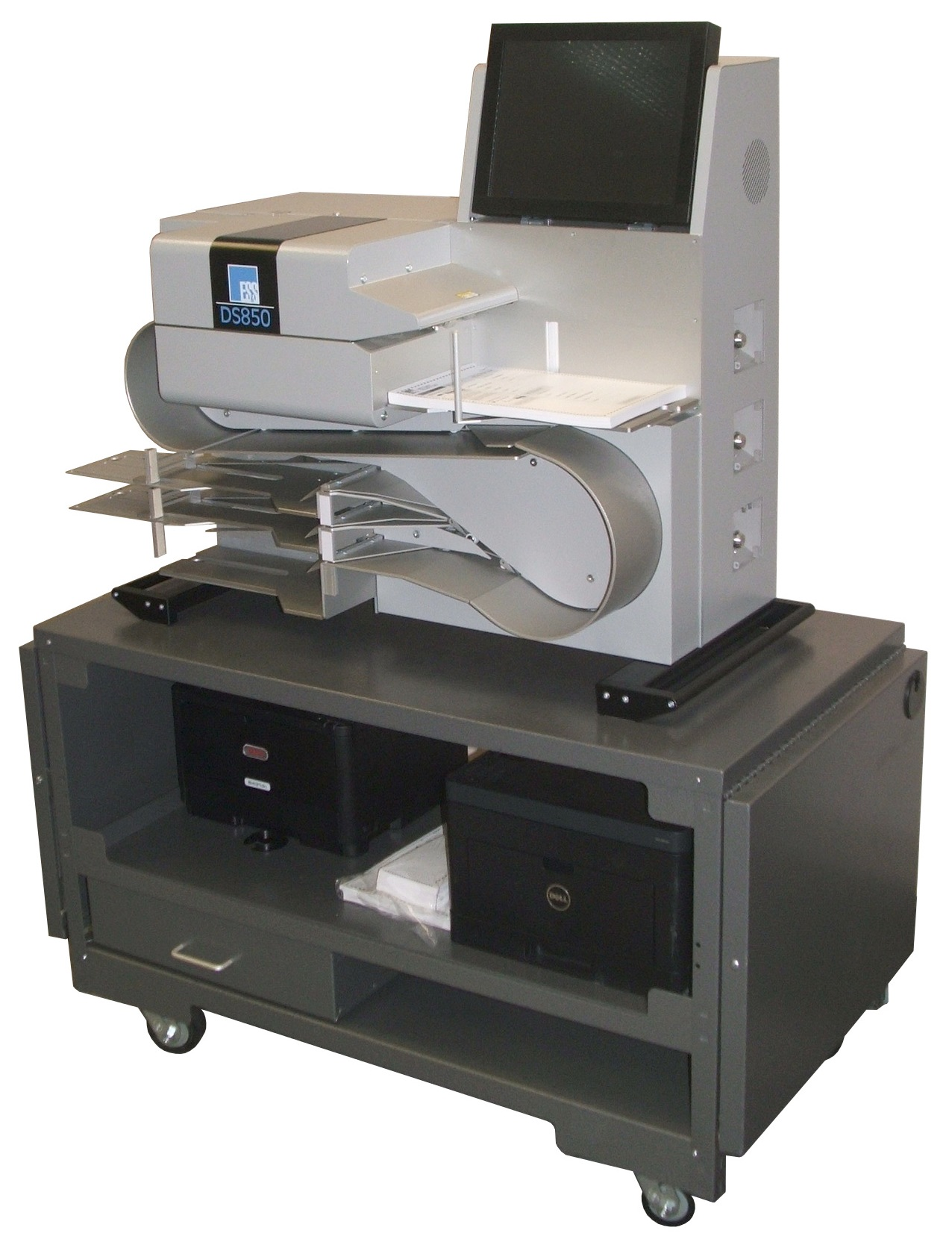
An ES&S DS850 8000-ballot-per-hour central-count ballot scanner

In October 1974, Robert J. Urosevich of Klopp Printing Company in Omaha approached Westinghouse Learning Corporation, a subsidiary of Westinghouse Corporation, asking whether the scanners Westinghouse was building for educational tests could be used to scan voting ballots. This led Westinghouse to briefly enter the ballot scanning business, and Urosevich and his brother Tod, a former IBM salesman, formed Data Mark Systems to sell and service Westinghouse voter tabulation equipment. Data Mark and Westinghouse ballot tabulation equipment had limited success through the late 1970s. As Westinghouse withdrew from the voting business, the Urosevich brothers and several former Westinghouse employees founded a new company in August 1979, American Information Systems (AIS). AIS came out with a line of central-count ballot scanners that entered the marketplace in 1982.

=== Business Records Corporation ===
The first precinct-count ballot scanner was the Gyrex MTB-1, which came to market around 1974. The MTB-1 evolved into the MTB-2, and corporate ownership shifted from Gyrex Corporation to Valtec, in 1977, and then to Major Data Concepts, in 1979. Computer Election Systems Incorporated (CESI), the manufacturer of Votomatic punched-card voting equipment, marketed the MTB-2 as the Tally-II scanner in the early 1980s, pairing it with its own Precinct-Ballot-Conut punched-card ballot reader, the PBC.

CESI developed its own family of precinct-count and later central-count scanners, under the Optech brand name. The Optech I precinct-count scanner came to market in 1983, and saw successful use in several states. Cronus Industries, Inc., a Texas-based company, purchased CESI in 1985 and merged it with their ballot printing subsidiary, Business Records Corporation (BRC).

==== Cronus Industries ====
Cronus Industries was formed in September 1976. Cronus, named after the Greek god Cronus, was an offshoot of Dallas, Texas-based company Tyler Corporation, which was previously a high tech military contractor known as Saturn Industries. Throughout the 1980s, its subsidiary, Business Records Corporation (BRC), acquired multiple small private companies that focused on providing information for local and county governments in the United States, including land records, election equipment and government software.

In 1983, Cronus began divesting from its agricultural equipment business. In 1984, Cronus acquired a steel-coating plant in Fairfield, Alabama from U.S. Steel. Between 1985 and 1986, Cronus acquired Computer Election Systems (CES) and eight other election equipment companies. After acquiring CES, Cronus chairman and CEO C. A. Rundell, Jr. claimed in 1985 that the company controlled 40% of the election equipment market in the United States, but refused to share a similar answer in 1988.

CES was founded in 1969 by four IBM employees: Robert P. Varni, Joseph H. Chowning, Jack Gerbel, and Ken Hazlett. In 1969, CES was one of five companies licensed by IBM to sell the Votomatic voting machine. The company went public in 1973, and its Votomatic had been integrated into 1,000 jurisdictions across the United States by the mid-1980s. In 1977, CES was purchased by an investment firm owned by Republican Prentis Cobb Hale, who strongly supported Ronald Reagan. According to The Texas Observer, the CES founders tended to lean Republican. According to one of the co-founders, CES faced a significant service decline under Hale’s leadership, starting around the 1980 United States elections.

By 1986, Cronus sold two of its subsidiaries (American Buildings Company and Polymer Metals Inc.), intending to focus on BRC.

By 1987, three investment firms collectively owned 19% of outstanding stock: First Pacific Advisors, Alex Brown Investment Management Company, and Charter Oak Partners, with the latter owning 10%.

In 1987, Cronus sued Shoup Voting Machine Corporation, accusing the company of copyright infringement over BRC’s DRE voting machines. Shoup in turn accused Cronus of attempting to monopolize the election equipment market in the United States and of enabling electoral fraud.

Also in 1987, Fred Meyer, the former president of Tyler Corporation, had run for mayor of Dallas. Rundell contributed $5,000 to Meyer's campaign. By 1988, Meyer was the chairman of the Republican Party of Texas. Rundell also contributed to right-wing Democrats Lloyd Bentsen and Ray Farabee.

In 1988, Rosewood Financial Inc., an investment vehicle which was owned by Caroline Rose Hunt and created by her estate trust, purchased a 6% stake in Cronus Industries. In the 1980s, Rosewood also had ownership in PVH Corp., First Executive, and IMC Global. According to a spokesman for Rosewood, Hunt did not take an active role in managing the company. Lloyd Donald Brinkman also owned over 5% by 1988.

Also in 1988, P.E. 'Bill' Esping, founder of First Data, became president and CEO of Cronus and BRC, a position he held until his death in 1998. He owned $10 million in company securities in 1988, which was equivalent to 12% ownership.

In 1990, Cronus changed its name to Business Records Corporation Holdings, Inc., and then again in 1992 to Business Records Corporation Holding Company. The company acquired CMSI, a private Oregon-based firm that sold information management services to healthcare organizations and local governments, in 1993. In 1996, the company changed its name again to BRC Holdings, Inc., expanding its focus to healthcare consulting by acquiring The Pace Group. After selling its election business to American Information Systems and Sequoia Pacific Systems in 1997, BRC Holdings Inc. was acquired by Affiliated Computer Services in 1998.

In 1996, the United States Securities and Exchange Commission sent a cease-and-desist letter to an investor, Alexander Sheshunoff, Sr., accusing him of market manipulation by attempting to influence the closing price of BRC between 1990 and 1995. He owned 5.32% of BRC common stock in 1989 and 8.05% of common stock in 1994.

=== Election Products Inc. ===
Election Products Inc. was a small Virginia-based election service company. In the early 1990s, the company contracted with ILJ Corporation based in Richmond, Virginia, to develop a DRE voting machine that would be marketed as the Votronic, unrelated to an earlier ballot scanner that was marketed under the same name in 1960. This voting machine had a flat panel liquid crystal display and a touchscreen, and was no larger than a laptop computer at the time. Votronic was first used in the 1996 primary elections; one commentator said the machine resembled a large Magna Doodle.

=== Automark Technical Systems LLC ===
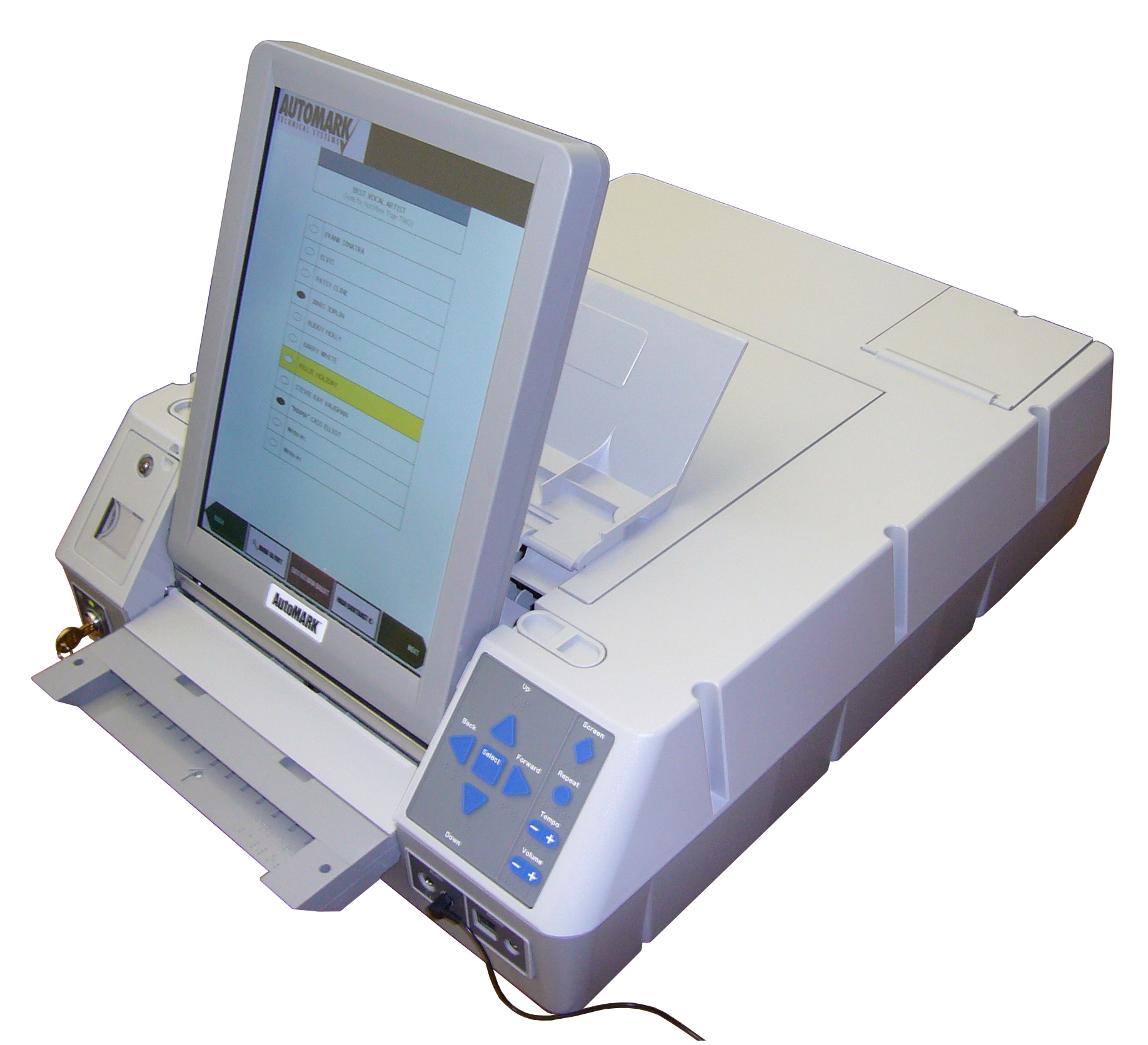
An AutoMARK ballot marking device

In 2003, Eugene Cummings filed a patent for a ballot marking device designed to provide an accessible voting interface for optical-scan voting systems. Cummings, along with Joseph Vaneck founded Automark Technical Systems LLC to develop and manufacture the machine. Prior to this machine, the Help America Vote Act, passed in 2002, required jurisdictions in the United States that used optical scan systems install at least one DRE voting machine in each polling place.

=== Mergers and antitrust actions ===
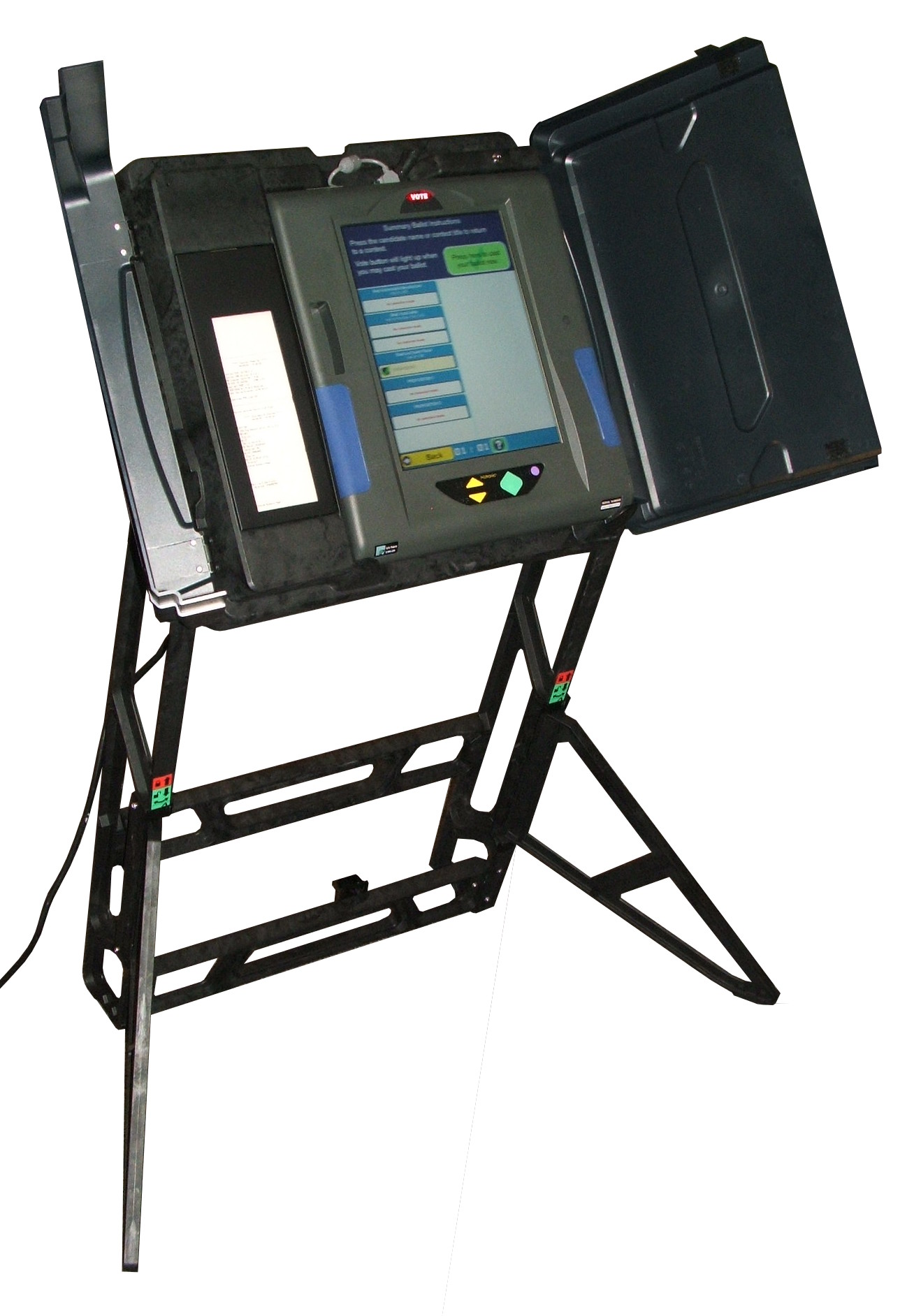
An iVotronic DRE voting machine with a real-time audit log printer, a type of voter-verified paper audit trail

American Information Systems acquired the Election Services Division of Business Records Corporation and was reincorporated as Election Systems & Software, Inc. in December 1997. At the time, AIS had about 750 customers and BRC had around 1200; customers were typically county election offices. With the merger, ES&S became the largest voting system vendor in the United States. The merger was delayed by the U.S. Department of Justice on antitrust grounds until ES&S agreed to transfer the Optech product line to Sequoia Voting Systems, while retaining the right to sell and service Optech products to its existing customers.

Shortly after the BRC-AIS merger, ES&S acquired the rights to Votronic, which they renamed iVotronic, and made major cosmetic changes to it. In their sales presentations, ES&S emphasized that the iVotronic was essentially the same machine as the Votronic except for features added to bring it into compliance with the Americans with Disabilities Act of 1990.

ES&S was one of the top four providers of voting equipment used in the November 2004 election. The other three were Diebold Election Systems, Sequoia Voting Systems, and Hart InterCivic.

In January 2008, ES&S acquired AutoMARK Technical Systems. Under ES&S's ownership, AutoMARK's use expanded considerably. Eight years after its acquisition by ES&S, in the 2016 elections, it was used statewide in ten states, and widely used in 19 additional states.

In September 2009, ES&S acquired Premier Election Solutions, formerly known as Diebold Election Systems. Following the acquisition, the Department of Justice and 14 individual states launched investigations into the transaction on antitrust grounds.

In March 2010, the Department of Justice filed a civil antitrust lawsuit against ES&S, seeking it to divest voting equipment systems assets it purchased in September 2009 from Premier Election Solutions in order to restore sufficient competition. The company later sold the assets to Dominion Voting Systems.

=== Recent history (1998-present) ===
ES&S had revenue of over $80 million in 1998, but declined to report revenue in 2014. Aldo Tesi was CEO from 2000-2015.

Texas Instruments supplies one of the chips used by ES&S. One of the company's "programmable logic devices" is from a United States-based firm with a factory in China.

Among other organizations, John Gottschalk was on the board for ES&S, the McCarthy Group, and the Kiewit Institute. Gottschalk recruited Chuck Hagel to join AIS in 1992.

For the 2000 United States elections, chairman Bill Welsh stated that, as preparation for any issues, ES&S had four business planes, two turboprops, and over 1,000 temporary workers (including some from Offut Air Force Base) on standby. By 2001, ES&S had installed equipment internationally, including Venezuela, Guam, the Republic of Palau, Canada, and the Autonomous Region in Muslim Mindanao.

As of October 2019, ES&S controls about 50% of the election system market of the United States; makes most of its money from long-term maintenance contracts; has filed lawsuits when it fails to win contracts or has them taken away; hired former election officials as lobbyists; donated to political campaigns and lobbied politicians; and threatened lawsuits against voting rights activists and security researchers. Between 2013 and 2020, ES&S has donated at least $30,000 to the Republican State Leadership Committee.

=== Ownership and management ===
As of June 2019, ES&S was wholly owned by Government Systems, Software & Services, Inc. McCarthy Group held a controlling ownership. Those with over 5% share investments in the company, as of June 2019, included Tom Burt and Tom O'Brien. Those with over 5% ownership stakes in McCarthy Group were Nancy McCarthy and Kenneth Stinson, both passive investors.

As of 2020, Burt is president and chief executive officer of ES&S.

ES&S was founded by Republicans was financed by the families of Howard Ahmanson Jr. and Nelson Bunker Hunt, is owned by a private equity firm, McCarthy Group, and its investors are not fully known as of December 2019. Chuck Hagel was chairman of a predecessor company to ES&S, and the treasurer for Hagel's campaign during the 1996 United States Senate election in Nebraska, Michael McCarthy, was the founder of McCarthy Group. According to Bev Harris' book on black box voting, ES&S is tied to Kiewit Corporation, which as of 2004 was involved in a number of bid rigging scandals; advocated for privatization of highways in the United States; owned CalEnergy, and was heavily involved in telecommunications via its ties to Level 3 Communications and installations of fiber-optic cables underneath highways and video surveillance cameras on roads. The Omaha World-Herald newspaper owned a stake in ES&S between 1986 and 2011. The Peter Kiewit Foundation in turn owned the Omaha World-Herald as of 2004.

==== McCarthy Group ====
As of 2025, ES&S is owned by M-One Capital, formerly known as McCarthy Group, which partnered with the founders of ES&S in 1987. McCarthy Group is an investment fund based in Omaha, Nebraska and founded in 1986 by Michael McCarthy and Richard Jarvis. The Nation described McCarthy Group as being "identified with Republican causes." As of the late 2000s, McCarthy Group has managed between approximately $500 million and $1 billion in assets. McCarthy Capital, a private equity firm, has been described as "the operating arm of McCarthy Group". McCarthy Capital has been involved in construction, agriculture, real estate development, and property management. As of 2022, McCarthy Capital and its affiliates have managed over $10 billion in assets.

According to Bev Harris, in 1987, William and Robert Ahmanson sold their shares in AIS to the Omaha World-Herald and McCarthy Group, with each company gaining 45% and 35% ownership, respectively. The Omaha World-Herald also owned the McCarthy Group as of 2004.

In 2004, the Omaha World-Herald Company owned about half of ES&S, while McCarthy Group owned about one fourth.

Michael McCarthy appointed Chuck Hagel as president of McCarthy Group in the 1990s. Hagel had reported to the United States Senate that his investments in McCarthy Group were valued between $1 million and $5 million. According to Bev Harris, Michael McCarthy had confirmed this investment as well as Hagel's investment in AIS Investors Inc., a group representing ES&S investors, in a 2003 interview. As of 2004, per the Center for Responsive Politics, the CEO of McCarthy Group, Michael McCarthy, had donated $28,750 to Republican politicians and candidates and $0 to Democratic politicians and candidates. Between 1999 and 2004, employees and executives donated $74,245 to Republicans and $13,300 to Democrats.

Michael McCarthy has also been on the board of directors for Union Pacific, Creighton University, Heritage Services, Joslyn Art Museum, Omaha Community Foundation, United Way of the Midlands, Omaha's Henry Doorly Zoo and Aquarium, Lasting Hope Recovery Center, Peter Kiewit Sons', Inc. and Cabela's.

Other board members as of the late 2000s included Bob Bates, Margie Doyle, John Gottschalk, Howard Hawks, Rich Jarvis, Gerald Timmerman, Norm Waitt, Dana Bradford, and Kenneth E. Stinson.

== Controversies ==
=== Voting machine vulnerabilities, errors and anomalies ===
==== CES ====
There were numerous voting machine issues from CES during the 1970s and 1980s, including the 1970 primary elections in Los Angeles, a 1976 legislative election in Los Angeles, a 1978 comptroller election in Illinois, a 1978 secretary of state election in Ohio, a 1978 school-board race in El Paso, Texas, the 1980 United States presidential election, and a 1984 school-board election in Carroll County, Maryland. "Hanging chads" were blamed during at least one election. Ohio Secretary of State Anthony J. Celebrezze Jr. and a Detroit city clerk separately found that CES punch-cards could disenfranchise tens of thousands of voters. Also in 1970, Price Waterhouse evaluated Votomatic at the request of St. Louis election commissioners. Price Waterhouse wrote a report documenting a lack of data quality controls and the potential for manipulation. Even though reports of "glitches" or errors were common during local elections, they received little attention from national media at the time.

In the early 1980s, at least four civil lawsuits were filed by political candidates who lost their elections against CES and/or corresponding local election officials, accusing them of direct involvement in election fraud. CES, who had eight other competitors in 1985, was the only company accused of fraud at the time. One of the lawsuits was filed by John G. Hutchinson, the mayor of Charleston, West Virginia in 1980. Computer science experts consulted either by the plaintiffs or independently by The New York Times alleged voting manipulation vulnerabilities and a lack of audit trails or safeguards. In Hutchinson's case, Judge Charles Harold Haden II, whose wife was the chairperson of Ronald Reagan's 1984 re-election campaign in West Virginia, disallowed evidence of security vulnerabilities and other flaws, ruled that the charges of fraud were "speculative", and ordered the plaintiffs to pay legal fees for CES and other defendants.

==== BRC ====
In 1986, Texas Attorney General Jim Mattox and Elections Director Karen Gladney investigated allegations of election fraud during the 1985 Dallas, Texas elections and the need for election integrity safeguards, respectively. The campaign manager for one of the mayoral candidates, Max Goldblatt, found statistical discrepancies in the number of voters and the numbers of ballots. The voting equipment for that election was manufactured by BRC. According to The New York Times, the investigation by Mattox was the first by a state attorney general regarding electronic voting machine vulnerability to election fraud.

==== AIS ====
===== 1996 United States Senate election in Nebraska =====
Hagel had stepped down from ES&S two weeks before he announced his run for Senate. However, he kept several millions of dollars in stock in McCarthy Group, the owner of ES&S. During the race, Hagel at first had lower poll ratings than the Democratic governor Ben Nelson. Three days before the election, an Omaha World-Herald poll showed that both candidates had 47% favorability ratings. Hagel had won the election by 15 percentage points, which was widely described as an "upset" since this election was the first that the Republican Party had won a Senate seat in Nebraska since 1978.

In 2002, the Democratic nominee Charlie Matulka challenged Hagel, who won 83% of the vote. At the time, this result was the one of the largest margins of victory in any statewide Nebraska election. While there were about 400,000 registered Democratic voters, Matulka won only 70,290 votes. Matulka petitioned for the Senate Ethics Committee to investigate due to Hagel not disclosing his financial interest in ES&S. This request was denied. Matulka also requested a ballot hand count. However, Nebraska state law required recounts to be performed on the same "vote-counting device" in the original election, which would have been from ES&S. When The Hill reported on Hagel's connections to ES&S in 2003, prior to publication, the reporter was visited by Lou Ann Linehan, Hagel's then-chief of staff, and "a prominent GOP lawyer", who asked the reporter "to soften the story or drop it."

80% of the votes won by Hagel in 1996 and 2002 were counted by AIS and ES&S, respectively.

==== ES&S ====
Various issues with ES&S systems have been reported since at least 1998, including missing votes, potential duplicate votes, poor calibration of touch screens leading to misinterpreted votes, names missing from voter rolls, incorrectly printed ballots and outdated technology.

The Institute for Southern Studies reported that, during the 2000 Venezuelan general election, Hugo Chávez and Venezuelan election officials accused ES&S of interference due to widespread issues with the company's voting machines.

Beth Clarkson, a Wichita State University statistician, filed an open records lawsuit for paper tapes from electronic voting machines in Sedgwick County, Kansas from the 2014 election, naming then-Kansas Secretary of State Kris Kobach as a defendant. She alleged that there were statistical anomalies that favored Republican politicians in vote counts in large precincts in multiple elections across the United States, assessing that this pattern was due to either voter fraud or a demographic trend unexplained by polling. According to the Verified Voting Foundation, all voting equipment used in that county on Election Day 2014 was manufactured by ES&S.

Concerns have also been raised by Ron Wyden about the security of its supply chain, as many parts were made in China and the Philippines. ES&S claimed that they had worked with Idaho National Laboratory for vulnerability testing, but as of December 2019, those findings have not been made public. In August 2018, Kamala Harris, Mark Warner, Susan Collins and James Lankford sent a letter to ES&S asking about their stance on independent security research after the company dismissed and discouraged such research on their systems. After the 2016 election, Jill Stein alleged that ES&S machines were vulnerable to hacking and difficult to audit, points supported by researchers. Issues with ES&S machines have also been reported during elections in 2018, 2019, 2021, 2022, 2023 and 2024.

In January 2020, NBC News reported that election security experts found at least 35 voting machines that were connected to the Internet as of the summer of 2019. While ES&S, Dominion Voting Systems and Hart InterCivic have all admitted to adding modems in some of their tabulators and scanners (for the purpose of quickly sharing unofficial election results), all of the voting machines that were accessible online were manufactured by ES&S and located in 11 states (including Florida, Wisconsin and Michigan) and Washington D.C. Some of these machines have been connected for months or possibly years at a time. Critical systems connected to the Internet via a firewall include vote tabulators and "the election-management system that is used in some counties to program voting machines before elections." Other security vulnerabilities - including missing firewall security patches, outdated SFTP server software, remote-access software, outdated operating systems, exposed passwords, exposed data of registered voters, no logging of some events, hash verification issues (noting that the hash verification was performed by ES&S instead of its customers), ballot marking device/scanner "hybrid" systems that can be changed with fake votes on machine-marked ballots after those ballots are cast, accessible SD and USB ports, plain text encryption keys for voter data, no set BIOS passwords, disabled Secureboot, presence of bloatware, no tamper-evident seals, immediate root access, unencrypted hard drives, use of simple default passwords, immutable passwords set such that "the same two passwords were used for every machine manufactured", susceptibility of central scanners to vote flipping, and "poor physical security protections that could allow undetected tampering" - were also reported. Free Press also warned of multiple vulnerabilities from electronic pollbooks manufactured by ES&S, including the possibility of compromised network infrastructure, voting machines, registration servers, voter data and/or the privacy of votes, as well as the risk of voter suppression.

A December 2020 investigation by DCReport found that the 2020 re-elections of Mitch McConnell, Lindsey Graham and Susan Collins had all occurred in states where votes were primarily tabulated by ES&S, arguing that their wins were improbable due to low or close pre-election polls. In the case of McConnell, DCReport found large vote leads in counties that had typically voted for Democrats (including in counties in which he had not previously won); discrepancies related to split-ticket voting; and issues with Kentucky voter records. McConnell had blocked legislation in the Senate for election security in 2019, the same year that his campaign committee received at least $2,000 from ES&S. A further investigation by the same outlet later that month found that multiple ES&S executives and lobbyists are connected with Republican party politicians and election officials (such as Sandra Mortham, Marci Andino and the office of Brian Kemp); that Chris Wlaschin, the former chief information security official at the United States Department of Health and Human Services during the Trump administration, had joined ES&S to lead their security team; that 40 out of 50 states partially use ES&S for casting and counting votes; and that during the 2020 election, all but three of the 25 states that Trump had won had partially or fully used ES&S voting machines. A 2021 article also noted that several Republican officials had refused to purchase equipment from Dominion due to false claims of fraud during the 2020 United States presidential election, alleging that ES&S would benefit by increasing its market share. Similarly, The Daily Dot reported that election security advocate Jennifer Cohn accused Republicans who falsely alleged that Dominion had helped commit fraud in the 2020 election of attempting to put Dominion out of business.

===== 2024 United States elections =====
During the 2024 elections, ES&S voting machines in Cambria County, Pennsylvania had issues scanning ballots due to a "ballot printing error", "[causing] voter confusion, long lines of voters, and many individuals [leaving] the polling locations without casting a ballot". The county's election director had retired on the same day that the election results were certified. State Representative Frank Burns called for an investigation by the Pennsylvania Department of State, and had asked for records about the ballots, voting machines, testing and internal communications, but his right to know request was denied by county election officials. By April 2025, the new county elections director had found a certification document stating that pre-election tests on voting machines were successfully completed in September 2024. Burns expressed concern why election officials were not aware of this document.

The Navajo Nation in Apache County, Arizona reported issues with voting machines and ballot printers on Election Day, leading to long lines that resulted in some voters being turned away. According to the Verified Voting Foundation, all voting equipment used in that county on Election Day 2024 was manufactured by ES&S. Similarly, there were issues with voting machines on Election Day in Queens, New York, a county that also used ES&S at the time.

In December 2024, the state of Texas decertified ES&S pollbooks due to widespread errors during the 2024 United States elections.

=== Campaign contributions ===
In the early 1990s, it was reported that Oklahoma County, Oklahoma Clerk Ralph Hess did not report a $1,000 contribution from BRC's political action committee. Then-BRC president Esping also contributed $100 and another employee donated $400, the latter of which was under-reported.

=== Antitrust investigation ===
In 1980, the antitrust division of the United States Department of Justice investigated CES, but the investigation ceased in January or February of 1981. Then CES-president David L. Dunbar said, "I used to kid people we had to get Ronald Reagan elected to get this thing killed."

=== Bribery allegations ===
In 2002, Arkansas Secretary of State Bill McCuen pleaded guilty to accepting bribes and kickbacks involving BRC. Tom Eschberger received immunity from prosecution in exchange for cooperation, and had since become a vice president of ES&S.

=== Voting system certifications ===
In May 2013, the Election Assistance Commission certified ES&S' EVS 5.0 election management system as meeting the commission's 2005 Voluntary Voting Systems Guidelines (VVSG). Products included in EVS 5.0 are ES&S' DS200 and DS850 vote tabulators.

EVS 5.0 also saw enhancements to the company's AutoMARK software, which is designed to be compliant with the federal Americans with Disabilities Act of 1990 for allowing voters with disabilities to cast ballots. In October 2012, the EAC certified ES&S' Unity 3.4.0.0 election management software.

In June 2014, the Virginia Board of Elections certified EVS 5201, the first state to certify an election management system that features the ExpressVote Universal Voting System. This election system combines paper-based voting with touch screen technology that's designed to serve every eligible voter, including those with disabilities.

The same month, following the certification of EVS 5201 was certified, Fairfax County, Virginia, purchased ExpressVote Universal Voting System. which it used for the first time in its November 2014 general election.

=== Electronic poll books ===
In January 2014, the City of Chicago reached an agreement with ES&S to provide more than 2,100 ExpressPoll voter check-in and verification devices to support Chicago's 1.6 million registered voters. The electronic poll books were first used in Chicago's 2014 primary elections.

=== Withdrawal and Reinstatement of InkaVote ===
On August 3, 2007, California Secretary of state Debra Bowen withdrew approval of the ES&S InkaVote Plus after announcing a "top-to-bottom review" of the voting machines certified for use in California in March 2007. However, the InkaVote Plus was never included in the review process conducted by Bowen's office. Bowen then approved InkaVote Plus for use by Los Angeles County and the city of Los Angeles on January 2, 2008.

=== Oakland County, Michigan ===
Early voters in the 2008 U.S. presidential election in Oakland County, Michigan reported instances of malfunctioning machines, complaining that they voted for one candidate and their vote was switched to another candidate. The Oakland County county clerk reported inconsistent results with some machines during testing in October.

Four years later, during the 2012 elections, ES&S added wireless modem technology so officials could make secure reports via cell phones. This upgrade was designed to improve the transparency and accuracy of Oakland County's election night reporting. The wireless technology used by Oakland County was tested by a federally accredited voting system test laboratory and subsequently tested and approved by the State of Michigan for pilot usage in the 2012 presidential election.

=== 2010 election problems ===
On April 14, 2010, the Cleveland Plain Dealer reported that, "about 10 percent of Cuyahoga County’s voting machines...[had] failed a pre-election test." After 20 months of investigation, the Election Assistance Commission recommended decertification of the ES&S voting machines if they could not be fixed. The investigation found:

- "The DS200 accepts a voted ballot but does not record the ballot on its internal counter. In addition the marks of the second ballot are not recorded."
- "When a 17” ballot was inserted at an angle, the DS200 did not consistently count the mark properly. The mark registered either as a different selection than intended or did not register at all."
- The system randomly freezes and does not record the freeze in its log files. There are other events not logged, such as touch screen calibration.

In May 2013, however, the Election Assistance Commission certified the DS200 as part of ES&S' EVS 5.0 election management system as meeting its 2005 Voluntary Voting Systems Guidelines (VVSG). Image of EAC certificate

=== Remote access controversy ===
In February 2018 article, The New York Times, reported that remote-access software had been found on an election management computer system used in Pennsylvania, and quoted unnamed sources, who said "ES&S has in the past sometimes sold its election-management system with remote-access software preinstalled." This was used by ES&S technicians to remotely access the systems via modem to troubleshoot and provide maintenance to systems they sold. The company denied this, saying "none of the employees...including long-tenured employees, has any knowledge that our voting systems have ever been sold with remote-access software."

In an April 2018 letter sent to U.S. Senator Ron Wyden, Election Systems & Software acknowledged that some of the election management systems the company sold for voting actually did have remote access software installed. The letter to Wyden had been in response to a question from the senator requesting clarification of the information on remote-access software in the New York Times article.

While election management systems are not the voting machines voters use to cast their ballots, they are used to program the voting machines used in a county and to count and tabulate the results from the voting machines. By installing remote access software allowing the machines to be accessed via the internet, the machines are vulnerable to being "hacked" remotely, allowing the counting to be altered surreptitiously, or malware to be installed to affect an election result. Motherboard, the site that originally published the story, reported that the remote access software installation was "the worst decision for security short of leaving ballot boxes on a Moscow street corner."

According to its April 2018 letter, ES&S claims to have stopped installing remote access software as of December 2007, which is required under the standards of the U.S. Election Assistance Commission.

=== Johnson County, Indiana ===
During the general election in November 2018, thousands of voters in Johnson County, Indiana were required to wait in line for hours as technical glitches and computer crashes caused issues throughout the county. A preliminary report prepared for the Indiana Secretary of State by Ball State University's Voting System Technical Oversight Program examined the reporting errors, and a preliminary report concluded that ES&S failed to report several anomalies that occurred prior to election day in violation of Indiana's state election law.

=== Operating software vulnerabilities ===
In July 2019, the Associated Press reported that, "the vast majority of 10,000 election jurisdictions nationwide use Windows 7 or an older operating system to create ballots, program voting machines, tally votes and report counts." Windows 7 reaches its "end of life" on January 14, 2020, meaning that Microsoft will cease providing technical support for the system, including patches to fix software vulnerabilities. For jurisdictions that already purchased systems running on Windows 7, ES&S said it would work with Microsoft to provide support until jurisdictions can update them. Windows 10 was released in 2015, and it was not immediately clear how long it would take to updates and associated federal and possible state certifications and to roll out updates. The company was not at the time sure that it could be done prior to the state's primaries, which began in February 2020. Kevin Skoglund, chief technologist at Citizens for Better Elections, said county election officials point to Election Assistance Commission and state certifications as "rock-solid proof" that their systems are secure, but do not realize that vendors are certifying systems under dated 2005 standards.

=== Modems and certification claims ===
In 2020, an independent cybersecurity investigation by the National Election Defense Coalition found voting systems still online, contrary to claims by election officials. ES&S was one of three companies, including Dominion Voting Systems and Hart InterCivic, that still put modems in their machines, many of which are protected by firewalls. Security officials maintain that such firewalls can still be breached. The National Institute of Standards and Technology advises that all voting systems should be prevented from connecting to wireless networks. National Election Defense Coalition identified ES&S as having sold machines with wireless modems to at least 11 states, including Michigan, Wisconsin and Florida. In 2020, ES&S informed NBC News that 14,000 DS200 tabulators with online modems were in use, a statement that contradicts their own website. NBC News also found thousands more online made by other companies. Groups like Free Speech for People and the National Election Defense Coalition maintain that ES&S falsely claims their online machines are certified by the U.S. Election Assistance Commission. The Commission does not certify voting machines with modems.

== See also ==
- Election security
- Electronic voting
- Voting technology in New York State
- Voting machine
