= Bev Harris =

American activist and writer

- Citizenship: American
- Occupations: Writer, Activist
- Known for: Founder of Black Box Voting
- Notable work: Discovered the source code of voting machine manufacturer Diebold Election Systems

Bev Harris is an American writer, activist, and founder of Black Box Voting, a national, nonpartisan elections watchdog group. She helped popularize the term "black box voting", while authoring a book of that title.

Original investigative work by Harris has been featured in The New York Times, The Washington Post, Time, CNN, ABC, MSNBC, CBS, Fox News, and NBC, as well as by the Associated Press, NPR, and many other mainstream news outlets.

In 2006, HBO released the documentary Hacking Democracy, which follows Bev Harris and Kathleen Wynne, director and associate director of Black Box Voting, respectively. Hacking Democracy was nominated for an Emmy Award for Outstanding Long Form Investigative Journalism.

== Diebold Investigation ==
In 2003, she discovered the source code of voting machine manufacturer Diebold Election Systems, which changed its name in 2006 to Premier Election Solutions.

After examining these files, Harris wrote an article on July 8, 2003, detailing how to bypass passwords and manipulate election results on the Diebold GEMS central tally system. The information in Harris's article was subsequently confirmed by internal memos written by Diebold's own engineers.

Researchers at Rice University and Johns Hopkins University also studied the programs she obtained and found security weaknesses that afforded opportunities for abuse. Diebold officials and state election officials disputed the findings of the Rice and Johns Hopkins researchers.

== Hacking Democracy ==
An organization founded as a nonprofit by Harris, Black Box Voting, was invited by Ion Sancho, Leon County, Florida Supervisor of Elections to conduct a series of tests of Diebold's GEMS central tabulator and Diebold's optical scan voting machines. The tests took place February 14, 2005; May 2, 2005; May 26, 2005 and December 13, 2005, and allege to prove that Diebold machines were not secure and could be hacked and results altered.

Her work to expose security weaknesses in electronic voting systems was assisted by Kathleen Wynne and is featured in an HBO documentary, Hacking Democracy. The film follows a series of investigations, many of them captured live on videotape by Kathleen Wynne.

In a public records request, Harris discovered that counterfeit audit records had been provided to Black Box Voting. Harris subsequently found some of the original records in the garbage at a Volusia County warehouse. Florida Fair Elections Coalition founder Susan Pynchon and Broward Election Reform Coalition founder Ellen Brodsky found more original poll tapes in the garbage behind the Volusia County elections office.

Harris, Wynne, and Andy Stephenson audited the originals against those given out by Volusia County in public records requests. Data on several of the poll tapes found in the garbage did not match data on the tapes provided in public records; many key audit items were missing, and unusual errors (such as a date-stamps 16,000 years in the future on one tape) indicated the alterations appeared to be due to alterations in programming the device that produces the poll tapes. Harris, Wynne and Hacking Democracy producer Russell Michaels, arranged for a series of hacking demonstrations on the "GEMS" central tabulator and also the hacking of memory cards. The finding of the records in the trash, along with the hacks, can be viewed in the HBO documentary Hacking Democracy, which premiered November 2, 2006.

== Other investigations ==
In March 2006, Black Box Voting was contacted by elections official Bruce Funk, from Emery County, Utah. Black Box Voting again secured the services of Harri Hursti and Dr. Herbert Hugh Thompson and examined the Diebold TSx touch-screen (DRE) system. Hursti, Thompson, and a member of the Black Box Voting board of directors, Jim March, found flaws which prompted emergency warnings and last minute corrective actions in Pennsylvania, California, and other states.

Harris's investigations into the testing laboratories that examine voting system software were revealed in a hidden camera interview in Hacking Democracy; she also obtained test laboratory reports that showed Ciber Laboratories omitted security testing on the machines.

Harris also identified and broke the story on the criminal records of a number of individuals who owned, programmed, and printed ballots in the elections industry.

== Diebold lawsuit ==
Together with Jim March, Harris filed a whistleblower lawsuit, alleging that Diebold Election Systems had made false claims when selling their system to Alameda County, California. In late 2004, Diebold agreed to pay the state of California $2.6 million to settle the case, and paid approximately $76,000 to Harris, which she donated to the then-nonprofit Black Box Voting organization.

== VoteHere investigation ==
She has been served with four cease and desist notices and in 2004, was interviewed by the United States Secret Service Cybercrime Task Force five times in connection with a claim by VoteHere, an electronic voting software company in Bellevue, Washington, that their site had been "hacked", with their source code stolen. In connection with this, Harris received a gag order from a U.S. Attorney in preparation for a federal grand jury investigation. An article by Seattle Weekly covered this.
