= Avi Rubin =

American computer scientist (born 1967)

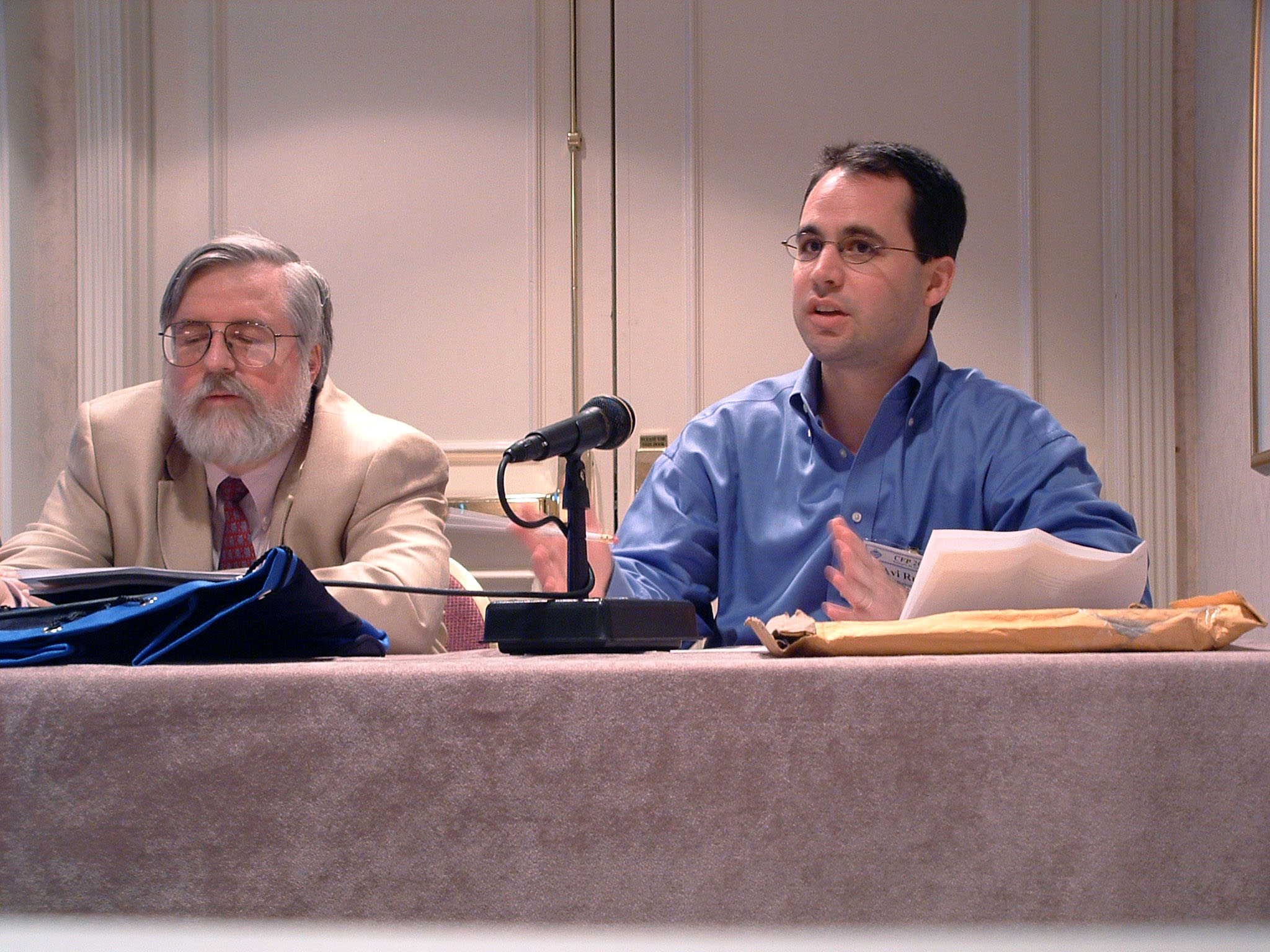
- Rubin (right) at the Computers, Freedom and Privacy 2006 conference
- Born: Aviel David Rubin
- Education: University of Michigan
- Scientific career
- Fields: Computer Science
- Workplaces: Johns Hopkins University; ACCURATE; USENIX

Aviel David "Avi" Rubin (born November 8, 1967) is an expert in systems and networking security. He is a graduate of the University of Michigan and professor of computer science at Johns Hopkins University, Technical Director of the Information Security Institute at Johns Hopkins, Director of ACCURATE, and President and co-founder of Independent Security Evaluators. In 2002, he was elected to the Board of Directors of the USENIX Association for a two-year term.

Rubin is credited with bringing to light vulnerabilities in Premier Election Solutions' (formerly Diebold Election Systems) AccuVote electronic voting machines. In 2006, he published a book on his experiences since this event.

In 2012, drawing on his experience as an expert witness in high-tech litigation, Rubin founded the consultancy Harbor Labs "to provide expertise in legal cases, including testimony, reports, source code review and analysis."

As of 2015, Rubin is Director of the Health and Medical Security Lab at Johns Hopkins.

Rubin is a self-professed "poker fanatic" and has competed against professional players on the Poker Night in America television show.

== Education ==
- 1994, Ph.D., Computer Science and Engineering, University of Michigan, Ann Arbor
- 1991, M.S.E., Computer Science and Engineering, University of Michigan, Ann Arbor
- 1989, B.S., Computer Science (Honors), University of Michigan, Ann Arbor
