= Black box voting =

Voting systems that do not disclose their methods

Black box voting is any system of voting on voting machines which does not disclose how the system operates, such as systems based on closed source software or other proprietary components. If a voting machine does not provide a tangible record of individual votes cast, it can be described as "black box voting".

== Etymology ==
The term, as described by Dr. Arnold Urken of Stevens Institute of Technology, comes from the jargon term black box, a device or system or object that can only be viewed in terms of its input and output characteristics, with no knowledge of its internal workings. Urken's group at Stevens Institute was one of the first independent testing authorities for voting machines.

"Black box voting" was coined by David Allen, a publisher, technical consultant and co-writer to author and activist Bev Harris. Harris popularized the term in her book of the same name, and maintains the BlackBoxVoting.org website.

Allen's formal definition is found on page 4 of the original edition of Harris's book: "Any voting system in which the mechanisms for recording and/or tabulating the vote are hidden from the voter, and/or the mechanism lacks a tangible record of the vote cast."

== Black box voting systems ==
Both optical scan systems which interpret paper ballots and Direct Recording Electronic (DRE) systems can be black box systems; in fact, mechanical voting machines can also be seen as black box systems, since only the technicians who set up the machines have access to the linkages between the voting levers on the face of the machine and the vote recording counters inside. Rhode Island Supreme Court Justice Horatio Rogers, in an 1897 dissenting opinion, wrote of one early mechanical voting machine that

... a voter on this voting machine has no knowledge, through his senses that he has accomplished a result. The most that can be said is, if the machine worked as intended, then he has made his holes and voted. It does not seem to me that this is enough.

Rogers' criterion for whether a voting machine is a black box is strict: you must be able to sense that it works correctly as you use it. A somewhat weaker criterion is sometimes accepted, based on whether the public is allowed to examine the mechanism, in a modern context, both the source code and hardware. Though source code may be available to voting system testing authorities and state or county election officials it can still be considered "black box" if it is not available to the public. Even with some open source systems, which allow examination of the source code, access to firmware, which controls the hardware, is not available.

Even if the source code is made public, significant challenges remain in the areas of authenticating that the code running systems in the field matches the publicly released code, and it is still possible to find attack vectors for open source systems.

In the 2004 United States presidential election, 32% of the voting was done on optical scan machines and 29% on DRE voting machines using trade secret proprietary software. As of February 2006, that figure had climbed to 49% for optical systems and 39% DRE.

Legislation has been introduced in the United States Congress to require public access to source code, hardware and firmware information, including the Voter Confidence and Increased Accessibility Act of 2007, introduced by Congressman Rush D. Holt, Jr. The last action on this legislation (HR 811 110th Congress) was for it to be placed on the Union Calendar number 91 in June 2007.

== See also ==
- ACCURATE
- Hacking Democracy
- Open Voting Consortium
- Voter Verified Paper Audit Trail
