= Premier Election Solutions =

Voting machine manufacturer

- Formerly: Diebold Election Systems, Inc.
- Type: Subsidiary
- Industry: Electronic Voting hardware Consulting
- Founded: January 22, 2002; 24 years ago (as Diebold Election Systems); Ohio, U.S.
- Fate: Acquired by Dominion Voting Systems
- Headquarters: North Canton, Ohio, U.S.
- Products: AccuVote-TSX, AccuVote-OS, AccuView Printer Module, Global Election Management System (GEMS), DIMS-NeT, ExpressPoll-2000, ExpressPoll-4000, VoteRemote Suite
- Website: Premier Election Solutions

Premier Election Solutions, formerly Diebold Election Systems, Inc. (DESI), was a subsidiary of Diebold that made and sold voting machines.

In 2009, it was sold to competitor ES&S. In 2010, Dominion Voting Systems purchased the primary assets of Premier, including all intellectual property, software, firmware and hardware for Premier's current and legacy optical scan, central scan, and touch screen voting systems, and all versions of the GEMS election management system from ES&S. At the time ES&S spun off the company due to monopoly charges, its systems were in use in 33 states and serving some 20 million people.

== History ==
DESI was run by Bob Urosevich, starting in 1976. In 1979, Bob Urosevich founded, and served as the president (through 1992) of, American Information Systems, now known as Election Systems & Software, Inc. (ES&S), becoming a chief competitor to DESI. Todd Urosevich, Bob's brother, was vice president, aftermarket sales, of Election Systems & Software, Inc.

In 1995, Bob Urosevich started I-Mark Systems, whose product was a touch screen voting system utilizing a smart card and biometric encryption authorization technology. Global Election Systems, Inc. (GES) acquired I-Mark in 1997, and on 31 July 2000, Bob Urosevich was promoted from Vice President of Sales and Marketing and New Business Development, to president and chief operating officer. On January 22, 2002, Diebold announced the acquisition of GES, then a manufacturer and supplier of electronic voting terminals and solutions. The total purchase price, in stock and cash, was $24.7 million. Global Election Systems subsequently changed its name to Diebold Election Systems, Inc.

=== Name change ===
In late 2006, Diebold decided to remove its name from the front of the voting machines in what its spokesperson called "a strategic decision on the part of the corporation". In August 2007 Diebold Election Systems changed its name to "Premier Election Solutions" ("PES").

==== Acquisition by Election Systems & Software ====
Election Systems & Software (ES&S) acquired Premier Election Solutions on September 3, 2009. ES&S President and CEO Aldo Tesi said combining the two companies would result in better products and services for customers and voters.

==== Acquisition by Dominion ====
Following the acquisition, the Department of Justice and 14 individual states launched investigations into the transaction on antitrust grounds. In March 2010, the Department of Justice filed a civil antitrust lawsuit against ES&S, requiring it to divest voting equipment systems assets it acquired from Premier Election Solutions in order to restore competition. The company sold the assets to Dominion Voting Systems.

Dominion Voting Systems acquired Premier on May 19, 2010. "We are extremely pleased to conclude this transaction, which will restore much-needed competition to the American voting systems market and will allow Dominion to expand its capabilities and operational footprint to every corner of the United States," said John Poulos, CEO of Dominion. The transaction was approved by the Department of Justice and nine state attorneys general.

== Controversies ==
=== O'Dell's fundraising ===
In August 2003, Walden O'Dell, chief executive of Diebold, announced that he had been a top fundraiser for President George W. Bush and had sent a get-out-the-funds letter to Ohio Republicans. In the letters he said he was "committed to helping Ohio deliver its electoral votes to the president next year." Although he clarified his statement as merely a poor choice of words, critics of Diebold and/or the Republican party interpreted this as at minimum an indication of a conflict of interest, at worst implying a risk to the fair counting of ballots. He responded to the critics by pointing out that the company's election machines division is run out of Texas by a registered Democrat. Nonetheless, O'Dell vowed to lower his political profile lest his personal actions harm the company. O'Dell resigned his post of chairman and chief executive of Diebold on December 12, 2005, following reports that the company was facing securities fraud litigation surrounding charges of insider trading.

=== Security and concealment issues ===
In January 2003, Diebold Election Systems' proprietary software, and election files, hardware and software specifications, program files, voting program patches, on its file transfer protocol site, were leaked, later 7 August 2003 leaked to Wired.

In 2004, Avi Rubin, a professor of computer science at Johns Hopkins University and Technical Director of the Information Security Institute, analyzed the source code used in these voting machines and reported "this voting system is far below even the most minimal security standards applicable in other contexts." Following the publication of this paper, the State of Maryland hired Science Applications International Corporation (SAIC) to perform another analysis of the Diebold voting machines. SAIC concluded "[t]he system, as implemented in policy, procedure, and technology, is at high risk of compromise."

In January 2004, RABA Technologies, a security company in Columbia, Maryland, did a security analysis of the Diebold AccuVote, confirming many of the problems found by Rubin and finding some new vulnerabilities.

In June 2005, the Tallahassee Democrat reported that when given access to Diebold optical scan vote-counting computers, Black Box Voting, a nonprofit election watchdog group founded by Bev Harris, hired Finnish computer expert Harri Hursti and conducted a project in which vote totals were altered, by replacing the memory card that stores voting results with one that had been tampered with. Although the machines are supposed to record changes to data stored in the system, they showed no record of tampering after the memory cards were swapped. In response, a spokesperson for the Florida Department of State said, "Information on a blog site is not viable or credible."

In early 2006, a study for the state of California corroborated and expanded on the problem; on page 2 the California report states that:

"Memory card attacks are a real threat: We determined that anyone who has access to a memory card of the AV-OS, and can tamper it (i.e. modify its contents), and can have the modified cards used in a voting machine during election, can indeed modify the election results from that machine in a number of ways. The fact that the results are incorrect cannot be detected except by a recount of the original paper ballots" and "Harri Hursti's attack does work: Mr. Hursti's attack on the AV-OS is definitely real. He was indeed able to change the election results by doing nothing more than modifying the contents of a memory card. He needed no passwords, no cryptographic keys, and no access to any other part of the voting system, including the GEMS election management server."

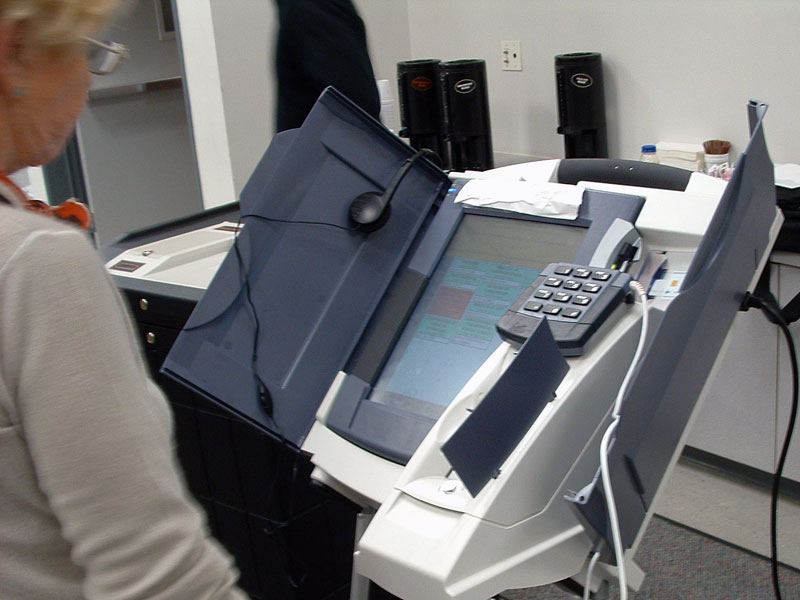
AccuVote-TSx DRE voting machine with VVPAT attachment, at right

A new vulnerability, this time with the TSx DRE machines, was reported in May 2006. According to Professor Rubin, the machines are "much, much easier to attack than anything we've previously said... On a scale of one to 10, if the problems we found before were a six, this is a 10. It's a totally different ballgame." According to Rubin, the system is intentionally designed so that anyone with access can update the machine software, without a pass code or other security protocol. Diebold officials said that although any problem can be avoided by keeping a close watch on the machines, they are developing a fix.

Michael I. Shamos, a professor of computer science at Carnegie Mellon University who is a proponent of electronic voting and the examiner of electronic voting systems for Pennsylvania, stated "It's the most severe security flaw ever discovered in a voting system." Douglas W. Jones, a professor of computer science at the University of Iowa, stated "This is the barn door being wide open, while people were arguing over the lock on the front door." Diebold spokesman David Bear played down the seriousness of the situation, asserting that "For there to be a problem here, you're basically assuming a premise where you have some evil and nefarious election officials who would sneak in and introduce a piece of software. I don't believe these evil elections people exist."

On October 30, 2006, researchers from the University of Connecticut demonstrated new vulnerabilities in Diebold AccuVote-OS optical scan voting terminal. The system can be compromised even if its removable memory card is sealed in place.

On September 13, 2006, Director of the Center for Information and Technology Policy at Princeton University, Professor Edward Felten, and graduate students Ariel Feldman and Alex Halderman discovered severe security flaws in a Diebold AccuVote-TS voting machine. Their findings claimed, "Malicious software running on a single voting machine can steal votes with little if any risk of detection. The malicious software can modify all of the records, audit logs, and counters kept by the voting machine, so that even careful forensic examination of these records will find nothing amiss."

On November 2, 2006, HBO premiered Hacking Democracy, a documentary about the vulnerability of electronic voting machines (primarily Diebold) to hacking and inaccurate vote totals. The company argued that the film was factually inaccurate and urged HBO to air a disclaimer explaining that it had not verified any of the claims. However, corroboration and validation for the exploits shown in Hacking Democracy was published in a report for the state of California (see above).

In January 2007, a photo of the key used to open Diebold voting machines was posted in the company's website. It was found possible to duplicate the key based on the photo. The key unlocks a compartment which contains a removable memory card, leaving the machine vulnerable to tampering.

A report commissioned by Ohio's top elections official on December 15, 2007, found that all five voting systems used in Ohio (made by Elections Systems and Software; Premier Election Solutions (formerly Diebold Election Systems); and Hart InterCivic) have critical flaws that could undermine the integrity of the 2008 general election.

On July 17, 2008, Stephen Spoonamore made the claim that he had "fresh evidence regarding election fraud on Diebold electronic voting machines during the 2002 Georgia gubernatorial and senatorial elections." Spoonamore is "the founder and until recently the CEO of Cybrinth LLC, an information technology policy and security firm that serves Fortune 100 companies." He claims that Diebold Election Systems Inc. COO Bob Urosevich personally installed a computer patch on voting machines in two counties in Georgia, and that the patch did not fix the problem it was supposed to fix. Reports have indicated that then Georgia Secretary of State Cathy Cox did not know the patch was installed until after the election.

=== States rejecting Diebold ===
In 2004, after an initial investigation into the company's practices, Secretary of State of California Kevin Shelley issued a ban on one model of Diebold voting machines in that state. California Attorney General Bill Lockyer, joined the state of California into a false claims suit filed in November 2003 by Bev Harris and Alameda County citizen Jim March.

The suit charged that Diebold had given false information about the security and reliability of Diebold Election Systems machines that were sold to the state. To settle the case, Diebold agreed to pay $2.6 million and to implement certain reforms. On August 3, 2007, California Secretary of State Debra Bowen decertified Diebold and three other electronic voting systems after a "top-to-bottom review of the voting machines certified for use in California in March 2007."

In April 2007, the Maryland General Assembly voted to replace paperless touchscreen voting machines with paper ballots counted by optical scanners, effective in time for the 2010 general (November) elections. The law, signed by the Governor in May 2007, was made contingent on the provision of funding by no later than April 2008. The Governor included such funding in his proposed budget in January 2008, but the funding was defeated by the state House in July 2008.

In March 2009, California Secretary of State Debra Bowen decertified Diebold's GEMS version 1.18.19 after the Humboldt County Election Transparency Project discovered that GEMS had silently dropped 197 ballots from its tabulation of a single precinct in Eureka, California. The discovery was made after project members conducted an independent count using the ballot counting program Ballot Browser.

=== Leaked memos ===
In September 2003, a large number of internal Diebold memos, dating back to 1999, were posted to the BlackBoxVoting.org web site, resulting in the site being shut down due to a Diebold cease and desist order. Later, other website organizations Why War? and the Swarthmore Coalition for the Digital Commons, a group of student activists at Swarthmore College posted the memos. U.S. Representative Dennis Kucinich, a Democrat from Ohio, placed portions of the files on his websites.

Diebold attempted to stop the publication of these internal memos by sending cease-and-desist letters to each site hosting these documents, demanding that they be removed. Diebold claimed the memos as their copyrighted material, and asserted that anyone who published the memos online was in violation of the Online Copyright Infringement Liability Limitation Act provisions of the Digital Millennium Copyright Act found in §512 of the United States Copyright Act.

When it turned out that some of the challenged groups would not back down, Diebold retracted their threat. Those who had been threatened by Diebold then sued for court costs and damages, in OPG v. Diebold. This suit eventually led to a victory for the plaintiffs against Diebold, when in October 2004 Judge Jeremy Fogel ruled that Diebold abused its copyrights in its efforts to suppress the embarrassing memos.

=== Stephen Heller ===
In January and February 2004, a whistleblower named Stephen Heller brought to light memos from Jones Day, Diebold's attorneys, informing Diebold that they were in breach of California law by continuing to use illegal and uncertified software in California voting machines. California Attorney General Bill Lockyer filed civil and criminal suits against the company, which were dropped when Diebold settled out of court for $2.6 million. In February 2006, Heller was charged with three felonies for this action. On November 20, 2006, Heller made a plea agreement to pay $10,000 to Jones Day, write an apology, and receive three years probation.

=== Diebold and Kenneth Blackwell's conflict of interest ===
Ohio State Senator Jeff Jacobson, Republican, asked Ohio Secretary of State Ken Blackwell, also a Republican, in July 2003 to disqualify Diebold's bid to supply voting machines for the state, after security problems were discovered in its software, but was refused. Blackwell had ordered Diebold touch screen voting machines, reversing an earlier decision by the state to purchase only optical scan voting machines which, unlike the touch screen devices, would leave a "paper trail" for recount purposes. Blackwell was found, in April 2006, to own 83 shares of Diebold stock, down from 178 shares purchased in January 2005, which he attributed to an unidentified financial manager at Credit Suisse First Boston who had violated his instructions to avoid potential conflict of interest, without his knowledge. When Cuyahoga county's primary was held on May 2, 2006, officials ordered the hand-counting of more than 18,000 paper ballots after Diebold's new optical scan machines produced inconsistent tabulations, leaving several local races in limbo for days and eventually resulting in a reversal of the outcome of one race for state representative. Blackwell ordered an investigation by the Cuyahoga County Board of Elections; Ohio Democrats demanded that Blackwell, who was also the Republican gubernatorial candidate in 2006, recuse himself from the investigation due to conflicts of interest, but Blackwell did not do so.

The Republican head of the Franklin County, Ohio Board of Elections, Matt Damschroder, said a Diebold contractor came to him and bragged of a $50,000 check he had written to Blackwell's "political interests."

== See also ==
- Black box voting
- ChoicePoint
- Electoral fraud
- 2018 United States elections (2018 Georgia elections)
