= Voting rights in the United States =

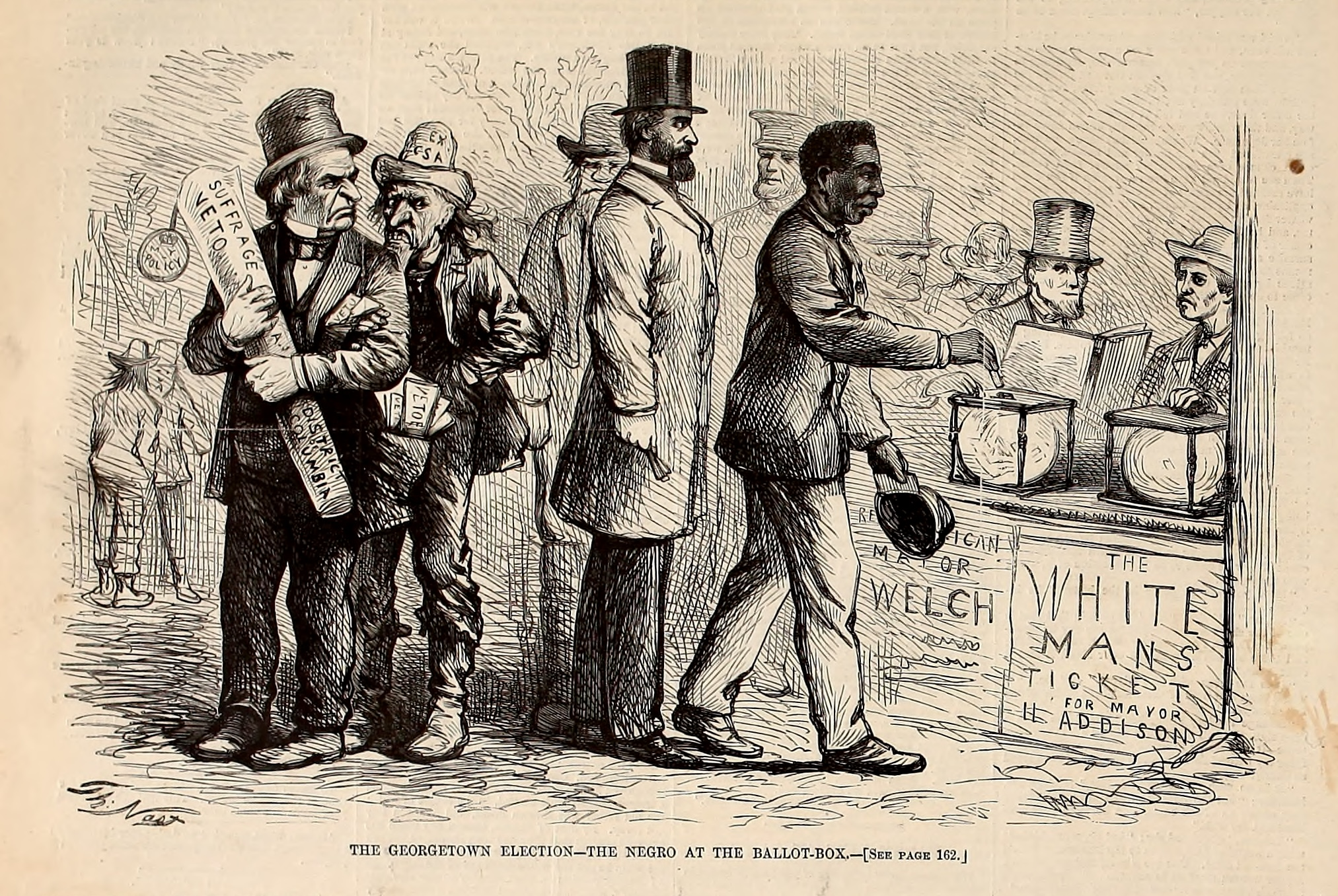
- Congress overrode Andrew Johnson's veto to pass the 1867 District of Columbia Suffrage Act (Thomas Nast, Harper's Weekly, March 16, 1867)

Demographics
- Poll taxes: Abolished 1964
- Literacy tests abolished: Abolished 1965 for federal elections
- Minimum voting age: 18 in most jurisdictions
- Preregistration age: 16 in 41 states and D.C.; 17 in 4 states; 17.5 or older in 4 states
- Felon voting status: Individual petitions required in 2 states; circumstantial in 5 states; restrictions under probation in 20 states; restrictions under parole in 2 states; unrestricted after prison release in 18 states and 2 territories; unrestricted in Maine, Vermont, Puerto Rico and D.C.
- Noncitizen voting: Banned in federal and all state elections, allowed in some jurisdictions

Voter registration
- Voter registration required: All states except in North Dakota
- Online voter registration: Implemented fully in 40 states, D.C. and Guam; in-process in Oklahoma and Maine; implemented in Texas for those renewing licenses
- Automatic voter registration: Implemented in 15 states and D.C.; in-process in 6 states
- Same-day registration: same-day and early-voting registration in 8 states and D.C.; same-day only in 9 states; early-voting only in 2 states; same-day and early-voting registration in-process in 2 states
- Partisan affiliation: Partisan registration in 31 states and D.C.; nonpartisan registration in 18 states

Voting process
- Polling place identification requirements: photo ID required in 8 states; photo ID requested in 9 states; non-photo ID required in 3 states; non-photo ID requested in 13 states
- Postal ballot status: no-excuse in 35 states (all-postal in 7 states)
- Permanent list postal ballot status: 10 states
- Election method: First-past-the-post plurality in 44 states; two-round systems in 5 states; ranked-choice voting in Maine

Voter powers
- Redistricting system: 12 states with nonpartisan or bipartisan commissions for congressional redistricting; 16 states with commissions for legislative redistricting; Iowa uses nonpartisan staff
- Prison-based redistricting: 10 states prohibit prison redistricting
- Ballot question rights: Legislative referral in 49 states and D.C. (26 states with some form of ballot initiative by petition)

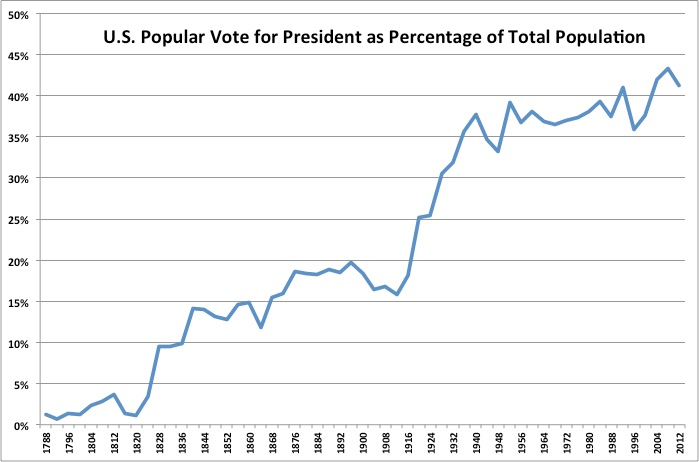
U.S. presidential election popular vote totals as a percentage of the total U.S. population. Note the surge in 1828 (extension of suffrage to non-property-owning white men), the drop from 1890 to 1910 (when Southern states disenfranchised most African Americans and many poor whites), and another surge in 1920 (extension of suffrage to women).

Enfranchisement and disenfranchisement of different groups have been a moral and political issue throughout United States history.

Eligibility to vote in the United States is governed by the United States Constitution and by federal and state laws. Several constitutional amendments (the Fifteenth, Nineteenth, and Twenty-sixth specifically) require that voting rights of U.S. citizens cannot be abridged on account of race, color, previous condition of servitude, sex, or age (18 and older); the constitution as originally written did not establish any such rights during 1787–1870, except that if a state permitted a person to vote for the "most numerous branch" of its state legislature, it was required to permit that person to vote in elections for members of the United States House of Representatives. In the absence of a specific federal law or constitutional provision, each state is given considerable discretion to establish qualifications for suffrage and candidacy within its own respective jurisdiction; in addition, states and lower level jurisdictions establish election systems, such as at-large or single member district elections for county councils or school boards. Thus, the enfranchisement or disenfranchisement in one state may be stricter or more lenient than in another state. Beyond qualifications for suffrage, rules and regulations concerning voting (such as the poll tax) have been contested since the advent of Jim Crow laws and related provisions that indirectly disenfranchised racial minorities.

A historic turning point was the 1964 Supreme Court case Reynolds v. Sims that ruled both houses of all state legislatures had to be based on electoral districts that were approximately equal in population size, under the "one man, one vote" principle. The Warren Court's decisions on two previous landmark cases—Baker v. Carr (1962) and Wesberry v. Sanders (1964)—also played a fundamental role in establishing the nationwide "one man, one vote" electoral system.

In cases of county or municipal elections, winner-take-all systems in at-large districts have been repeatedly challenged as diluting the voting power of racial minorities, violating the Voting Rights Act. Generally the solution to such violations has been to adopt single-member districts (SMDs), but systems of proportional representation such as the single non-transferable vote and cumulative voting have also been used since the late 20th century to correct for dilution of voting power and enable minorities to elect candidates of their choice.

Citizens living in U.S. territories cannot vote for president of the United States. However, those residing in the District of Columbia can vote for president as a result of the Twenty-third Amendment.

== Background ==
The right to vote is the foundation of any democracy. Chief Justice Earl Warren, for example, wrote in Reynolds v. Sims, 377 U.S. 533, 555 (1964): "The right to vote freely for the candidate of one's choice is of the essence of a democratic society, and any restrictions on that right strike at the heart of representative government. [...] Undoubtedly, the right of suffrage is a fundamental matter in a free and democratic society. Especially since the right to exercise the franchise in a free and unimpaired manner is preservative of other basic civil and political rights, any alleged infringement of the right of citizens to vote must be carefully and meticulously scrutinized." Justice Hugo Black shared the same sentiment by stating in Wesberry v. Sanders, 376 U.S. 1, 17 (1964): "No right is more precious in a free country than that of having a voice in the election of those who make the laws under which, as good citizens, we must live. Other rights, even the most basic, are illusory if the right to vote is undermined."!

In the 17th-century Thirteen Colonies, suffrage was often restricted by property qualifications or with a religious test. In 1660, Plymouth Colony restricted suffrage with a specified property qualification, and in 1671, Plymouth Colony restricted suffrage further to only freemen "orthodox in the fundamentals of religion". Connecticut in mid-century also restricted suffrage with a specified property qualification and a religious test, and in Pennsylvania, the Province of Carolina, and the Colony of Rhode Island and Providence Plantations voting rights were restricted to Christians only. Under the Duke's Laws in colonial New York, suffrage did not require a religious test but was restricted to landholders. In Virginia, all white freemen were allowed to vote until suffrage was restricted temporarily to householders from 1655 to 1656, to freeholders from 1670 to 1676, and following the death of Nathaniel Bacon in 1676, to freeholders permanently. Quakers were not permitted to vote in Plymouth Colony or in the Massachusetts Bay Colony, and along with Baptists, were not permitted to vote in several other colonies as well, and Catholics were disenfranchised following the Glorious Revolution (1688–1689) in Maryland, New York, Rhode Island, Carolina, and Virginia.

In the 18th-century Thirteen Colonies, suffrage was restricted to European men with the following property qualifications:

- Connecticut: an estate worth 40 shillings annually or £40 of personal property
- Delaware: fifty acres of land (twelve under cultivation) or £40 of personal property
- Georgia: fifty acres of land
- Maryland: fifty acres of land and £40 personal property
- Massachusetts Bay: an estate worth 40 shillings annually or £40 of personal property
- New Hampshire: £50 of personal property
- New Jersey: one-hundred acres of land, or real estate or personal property £50
- New York: £40 of personal property or ownership of land
- North Carolina: fifty acres of land
- Pennsylvania: fifty acres of land or £50 of personal property
- Rhode Island and Providence Plantations: personal property worth £40 or yielding 50 shillings annually
- South Carolina: one-hundred acres of land on which taxes were paid; or a town house or lot worth £60 on which taxes were paid; or payment of 10 shillings in taxes
- Virginia: fifty acres of vacant land, twenty-fives acres of cultivated land, and a house twelve feet by twelve feet; or a town lot and a house twelve feet by twelve

By the time the United States Constitution came into effect on March 9, 1789, a small number of free Blacks were among the voting citizens (men of property) in some states. The Constitution did not originally define who was eligible to vote, allowing each state to determine who was eligible. In the early history of the U.S., some states allowed only white male adult property owners to vote, while others either did not specify race, or specifically protected the rights of men of any race to vote. Women were largely prohibited from voting, as were men without property. Women could vote in New Jersey until 1807 (provided they could meet the property requirement) and in some local jurisdictions in other northern states. Free Blacks could also vote in these jurisdictions, provided they could meet the property requirement. In New Jersey particularly, these property requirements were purposely set quite low.

Beginning around 1790, individual states began to eschew property ownership as a qualification for enfranchisement in favor of sex and race, with most states disenfranchising women and non-white men. By 1856, white men were allowed to vote in all states regardless of property ownership, although requirements for paying tax remained in five states. Several states, including Pennsylvania and New Jersey, stripped the free black males of the right to vote in the same period.

Four of the fifteen post-Civil War constitutional amendments were ratified to extend voting rights to different groups of citizens. These extensions state that voting rights cannot be denied or abridged based on the following:

- "Race, color, or previous condition of servitude" (Fifteenth Amendment, 1870)
- Sex (Nineteenth Amendment, 1920)
- "[F]ailure to pay any poll tax or other tax" for federal elections (Twenty-fourth Amendment, 1964) (Note: For state elections: Harper v. Virginia Board of Elections, 383 U.S. 663 (1966))
- Age (for persons "[w]ho are eighteen years of age or older") (Twenty-sixth Amendment, 1971)

Following the Reconstruction era until the culmination of the civil rights movement, Jim Crow laws such as literacy tests, poll taxes, and religious tests were some of the state and local laws used in various parts of the United States to deny immigrants (including legal ones and newly naturalized citizens), non-white citizens, Native Americans, and any other locally "undesirable" groups from exercising voting rights granted under the Constitution. Because of such state and local discriminatory practices, over time, the federal role in elections has increased, through amendments to the Constitution and enacted legislation. These reforms in the 19th and 20th centuries extended the franchise to non-whites, those who do not own property, women, and those 18–21 years old.

Since the "right to vote" is not explicitly stated in the U.S. Constitution except in the above referenced amendments, and only in reference to the fact that the franchise cannot be denied or abridged based solely on the aforementioned qualifications, the "right to vote" is perhaps better understood, in layman's terms, as only prohibiting certain forms of legal discrimination in establishing qualifications for suffrage. States may deny the "right to vote" for other reasons. For example, many states require eligible citizens to register to vote a set number of days prior to the election in order to vote. More controversial restrictions include those laws that prohibit convicted felons from voting, even those who have served their sentences. In addition, voter ID laws vary between the states, with some states strictly requiring a photo ID for one to vote while other states may not require any ID at all. Another example, seen in Bush v. Gore, are disputes as to what rules should apply in vote counting or election recounts.

A state may choose to fill an office by means other than an election. For example, upon death or resignation of a legislator, the state may allow the affiliated political party to choose a replacement to hold office until the next scheduled election. Such an appointment is often affirmed by the governor.

The Constitution, in Article VI, clause (paragraph) 3, does state that "no religious Test shall ever be required as a Qualification to any Office or public Trust under the United States".

== Milestones of national franchise changes ==
- 1789: The Constitution grants the states the power to set voting requirements. Generally, states limited this right to property-owning or tax-paying white males (about 6% of the population).
- 1790: The Naturalization Act of 1790 limited citizenship to "free white persons." In practice, only white male property owners could naturalize and acquire the status of citizens, and the vote.
- 1792–1838: Free black males lose the right to vote in several Northern states including in Pennsylvania and in New Jersey.
- 1792–1856: Abolition of property qualifications for white men, from 1792 (New Hampshire) to 1856 (North Carolina) during the periods of Jeffersonian and Jacksonian democracy. However, tax-paying qualifications remained in five states in 1860—Massachusetts, Rhode Island, Pennsylvania, Delaware and North Carolina. They survived in Pennsylvania and Rhode Island until the 20th century.
  - In the 1820 election, there were 108,359 ballots cast. Most older states with property restrictions dropped them by the mid-1820s, except for Rhode Island, Virginia and North Carolina. No new states had property qualifications although three had adopted tax-paying qualifications – Ohio, Louisiana, and Mississippi, of which only in Louisiana were these significant and long lasting.
  - The 1828 presidential election was the first in which non-property-holding white males could vote in the vast majority of states. By the end of the 1820s, attitudes and state laws had shifted in favor of universal white male suffrage.
  - Voter turnout soared during the 1830s, reaching about 80% of adult white male population in the 1840 presidential election. 2,412,694 ballots were cast, an increase that far outstripped natural population growth, making poor voters a huge part of the electorate. The process was peaceful and widely supported, except in the state of Rhode Island where the Dorr Rebellion of the 1840s demonstrated that the demand for equal suffrage was broad and strong, although the subsequent reform included a significant property requirement for anyone resident but born outside of the United States.
  - The last state to abolish property qualification was North Carolina in 1856. However, tax-paying qualifications remained in five states in 1860 – Massachusetts, Rhode Island, Pennsylvania, Delaware and North Carolina. They survived in Pennsylvania and Rhode Island until the 20th century. In addition, many poor whites were later disenfranchised.
- 1868: Citizenship is guaranteed to all persons born or naturalized in the United States by the Fourteenth Amendment, setting the stage for future expansions to voting rights.
- 1869–1920: Some states allow women to vote. Wyoming was the first state to give women voting rights in 1869.
- 1870: The Fifteenth Amendment prevents state governments and the federal government from denying the right to vote on grounds of "race, color, or previous condition of servitude".
  - Disfranchisement after Reconstruction era began soon after. Former Confederate states passed Jim Crow laws and amendments to effectively disfranchise African-American and poor white voters through poll taxes, literacy tests, grandfather clauses and other restrictions, applied in a discriminatory manner. During this period, the Supreme Court generally upheld state efforts to discriminate against racial minorities; only later in the 20th century were these laws ruled unconstitutional. Black males in the Northern states could vote, but the majority of African Americans lived in the South.
- 1887: Citizenship is granted to Native Americans who are willing to disassociate themselves from their tribe by the Dawes Act, making the men technically eligible to vote.
- 1913: Direct election of Senators, established by the Seventeenth Amendment, gave voters rather than state legislatures the right to elect senators.
- 1915 Decision in Supreme Court case Guinn v. United States rules unconstitutional the use of grandfather clauses to allow European-Americans to vote while excluding African-Americans.
- 1920: Women are guaranteed the right to vote in all US States by the Nineteenth Amendment. In practice, the same restrictions that hindered the ability of poor or non-white men to vote now also applied to poor or non-white women.
- 1924: All Native Americans are granted citizenship and the right to vote, regardless of tribal affiliation. By this point, approximately two thirds of Native Americans were already citizens. Notwithstanding, some western states continued to bar Native Americans from voting until 1948.
- 1943: Chinese immigrants given the right to citizenship and the right to vote by the Magnuson Act.
- 1948: Arizona and New Mexico became one of the last states to extend full voting rights to Native Americans, which had been opposed by some western states in contravention of the Indian Citizenship Act of 1924.
- 1954–1955: Maine extends full voting rights to Native Americans who live on reservations. Activist, Lucy Nicolar Poolaw (Penobscot), is the first to cast her vote under the new law.
- 1961: Residents of Washington, D.C. are granted the right to vote in U.S. Presidential Elections by the Twenty-third Amendment.
- 1962–1964: A historic turning point arrived after the U.S. Supreme Court under Chief Justice Earl Warren made a series of landmark decisions which helped establish the nationwide "one man, one vote" electoral system in the United States.
  - In March 1962, the Warren Court ruled in Baker v. Carr (1962) that redistricting qualifies as a justiciable question, thus enabling federal courts to hear redistricting cases.
  - In February 1964, the Warren Court ruled in Wesberry v. Sanders (1964) that districts in the United States House of Representatives must be approximately equal in population.
  - In June 1964, the Warren Court ruled in Reynolds v. Sims (1964) that both houses of the electoral districts of state legislative chambers must be roughly equal in population.
- 1964: Poll tax payment prohibited from being used as a condition for voting in federal elections (only) by the Twenty-fourth Amendment.
- 1965: Protection of voter registration and voting for racial minorities, later applied to language minorities, is established by the Voting Rights Act of 1965. This has also been applied to correcting discriminatory election systems and districting.
- 1966: Tax payment and wealth requirements for voting in state elections are prohibited by the Supreme Court in Harper v. Virginia Board of Elections, under the Equal Protection Clause of the Fourteenth Amendment.
- 1971: Adults aged 18 through 20 are granted the right to vote by the Twenty-sixth Amendment. This was enacted in response to Vietnam War protests, which argued that soldiers who were old enough to fight for their country should be granted the right to vote.
- 1986: United States Military and Uniformed Services, Merchant Marine, other citizens overseas, living on bases in the United States, abroad, or aboard ship are granted the right to vote by the Uniformed and Overseas Citizens Absentee Voting Act.

== Native American people ==
From 1778 to 1871, the government tried to resolve its relationship with the various native tribes by negotiating treaties. These treaties formed agreements between two sovereign nations, stating that Native American people were citizens of their tribe, living within the boundaries of the United States. The treaties were negotiated by the executive branch and ratified by the U.S. Senate. It said that native tribes would give up their rights to hunt and live on huge parcels of land that they had inhabited in exchange for trade goods, yearly cash annuity payments, and assurances that no further demands would be made on them. Most often, part of the land would be "reserved" exclusively for the tribe's use.

Throughout the 1800s, many native tribes gradually lost claim to the lands they had inhabited for centuries through the federal government's Indian Removal policy to relocate tribes from the Southeast and Northwest to west of the Mississippi River. European-American settlers continued to encroach on western lands. Only in 1879, in the Standing Bear trial, were American Indians recognized as persons in the eyes of the United States government. Judge Elmer Scipio Dundy of Nebraska declared that Indians were people within the meaning of the laws, and they had the rights associated with a writ of habeas corpus. However, Judge Dundy left unsettled the question as to whether Native Americans were guaranteed US citizenship.

Although Native Americans were born within the national boundaries of the United States, those on Indian reservations were considered citizens of their own tribes, rather than of the United States. They were denied the right to vote because they were not considered citizens by law and were thus ineligible. Many Native Americans were told they would become citizens if they gave up their tribal affiliations in 1887 under the Dawes Act, which allocated communal lands to individual households and was intended to aid in the assimilation of Native Americans into majority culture. This still did not guarantee their right to vote. In 1924, the remaining Native Americans, estimated at one-third, became United States citizens through the Indian Citizenship Act. Many western states, however, continued to restrict Native American ability to vote through property requirements, economic pressures, hiding the polls, and condoning of physical violence against those who voted. Since the late 20th century, they have been protected under provisions of the Voting Rights Act as a racial minority, and in some areas, language minority, gaining election materials in their native languages.

=== Alaska Natives ===
The Alaskan Territory did not consider Alaska Natives to be citizens of the United States and so they could not vote. An exception to this rule was that indigenous women were considered citizens if they were married to white men. In 1915, the Territorial Legislature passed a law that allowed Alaska Natives the right to vote if they gave up their "tribal customs and traditions." William Paul (Tlingit) fought for the right of Alaska Natives to vote during the 1920s. Others, like Tillie Paul (Tlingit) and Charlie Jones (Tlingit), were arrested for voting because they were still not considered citizens. Later, Paul would win a court case that set the precedent that Alaska Natives were legally allowed to vote. In 1925, a literacy test was passed in Alaska to suppress the votes of Alaska Natives. After passage of the Alaska Equal Rights Act of 1945, Alaska Natives gained more rights, but there was still voter discrimination. When Alaska became a state, the new Constitution of Alaska provided Alaskans with a more lenient literacy test. In 1970, the Alaska Legislature ratified a constitutional amendment against state voter literacy tests. The Voting Rights Act of 1965 (VRA), modified in 1975, provided additional help for Alaska Natives who do not speak English, which affects around 14 census areas. Many villages with large Alaska Native populations continue to face difficulties voting.

== Religious test ==
In several British North American colonies before and after the 1776 Declaration of Independence, certain individuals such as Jews, Quakers, Catholics or atheists were excluded from the franchise or from running for elections.

The Delaware Constitution of 1776 stated that "Every person who shall be chosen a member of either house, or appointed to any office or place of trust, before taking his seat, or entering upon the execution of his office, shall ... also make and subscribe the following declaration, to wit: I, A B. do profess faith in God the Father, and in Jesus Christ His only Son, and in the Holy Ghost, one God, blessed for evermore; and I do acknowledge the holy scriptures of the Old and New Testament to be given by divine inspiration.". This was repealed by Article I, Section II. of the 1792 Constitution: "No religious test shall be required as a qualification to any office, or public trust, under this State". The 1778 Constitution of the State of South Carolina stated, "No person shall be eligible to sit in the house of representatives unless he be of the Protestant religion", the 1777 Constitution of the State of Georgia (art. VI) that "The representatives shall be chosen out of the residents in each county ... and they shall be of the Protestant religion".

With the growth in the number of Baptists in Virginia before the American Revolution, who challenged the established Church of England, the issues of religious freedom became important to rising leaders such as James Madison. As a young lawyer, he defended Baptist preachers who were not licensed by (and were opposed by) the established state Anglican Church. He carried developing ideas about religious freedom to be incorporated into the constitutional convention of the United States.

In 1787, Article One of the United States Constitution stated that "the Electors in each State shall have the Qualifications requisite for Electors of the most numerous Branch of the State Legislature". More significantly, Article Six disavowed the religious test requirements of several states, saying: "[N]o religious Test shall ever be required as a Qualification to any Office or public Trust under the United States."

But, in Maryland, Jewish Americans were excluded from state office until the law requiring candidates to affirm a belief in an afterlife was repealed in 1828.

== African Americans and poor whites ==
At the time of ratification of the Constitution in the late 18th century, most states had property qualifications which restricted the franchise; the exact amount varied by state, but by some estimates, more than half of white men were disenfranchised. Several states granted suffrage to free men of color after the Revolution, including North Carolina. This fact was noted by Justice Benjamin Robbins Curtis' dissent in Dred Scott v. Sandford (1857), as he emphasized that blacks had been considered citizens at the time the Constitution was ratified:

Of this there can be no doubt. At the time of the ratification of the Articles of Confederation, all free native-born inhabitants of the States of New Hampshire, Massachusetts, New York, New Jersey, and North Carolina, though descended from African slaves, were not only citizens of those States, but such of them as had the other necessary qualifications possessed the franchise of electors, on equal terms with other citizens.

- In the 1820s, New York State enlarged its franchise to white men by dropping the property qualification, but maintained it for free blacks.
- The Supreme Court of North Carolina had upheld the ability of free African Americans to vote in that state. In 1835, because of fears of the role of free blacks after Nat Turner's Slave Rebellion of 1831, they were disenfranchised by decision of the North Carolina Constitutional Convention. At the same time, convention delegates relaxed religious and property qualifications for whites, thus expanding the franchise for them.
- Alabama entered the union in 1819 with universal white suffrage provided in its constitution.

When the Fourteenth Amendment was ratified in 1868 after the Civil War, it granted citizenship to all persons born or naturalized in the United States and subject to its jurisdiction. In 1869, the Fifteenth Amendment prohibited the government from denying a citizen the right to vote based on that citizen's "race, color, or previous condition of servitude". The major effect of these amendments was to enfranchise African American men, the overwhelming majority of whom were freedmen in the South.

After the war, some Southern states passed "Black Codes", state laws to restrict the new freedoms of African Americans. They attempted to control their movement, assembly, working conditions and other civil rights. Some states also prohibited them from voting.

The Fifteenth Amendment, one of three ratified after the American Civil War to grant freedmen full rights of citizenship, prevented any state from denying the right to vote to any citizen based on race. This was primarily related to protecting the franchise of freedmen, but it also applied to non-white minorities, such as Mexican Americans in Texas. The state governments under Reconstruction adopted new state constitutions or amendments designed to protect the ability of freedmen to vote. The white resistance to black suffrage after the war regularly erupted into violence as white groups tried to protect their power. Particularly in the South, in the aftermath of the Civil War whites made efforts to suppress freedmen's voting. In the 1860s, secret vigilante groups such as the Ku Klux Klan (KKK) used violence and intimidation to keep freedmen in a controlled role and reestablish white supremacy. The United States Army and Department Of Justice were successfully able to disband the Klan through prosecution and black freedmen registered and voted in high numbers, many of whom were elected to local offices through the 1880s.

In the mid-1870s, the insurgencies continued with a rise in more powerful white paramilitary groups, such as the White League, originating in Louisiana in 1874 after a disputed gubernatorial election; and the Red Shirts, originating in Mississippi in 1875 and developing numerous chapters in North and South Carolina; as well as other "White Line" rifle clubs. They operated openly, were more organized than the KKK, and directed their efforts at political goals: to disrupt Republican organizing, turn Republicans out of office, and intimidate or kill blacks to suppress black voting. They worked as "the military arm of the Democratic Party". For instance, estimates were that 150 blacks were killed in North Carolina before the 1876 elections. Economic tactics such as eviction from rental housing or termination of employment were also used to suppress the black vote. The federal government withdrew its troops as a result of a national compromise related to the presidency, officially ending Reconstruction, and soon afterward the Supreme Court would strike down nearly every law passed through reconstruction that protected freedman from racially motivated violence from private actors while also taking a narrow view to the federal government's ability to enforce laws against state actors who perpetrated racially motivated violence. White Democrats regained power in state legislatures across the South by the late 1870s and declined to enforce laws against white supremacist paramilitary groups.

African Americans were a majority in three Southern states following the Civil War, and represented over 40% of the population in four other states and many whites feared and resented the political power exercised by freedmen. After ousting the Republicans, whites worked to restore white supremacy.

Although elections were often surrounded by violence, blacks continued to vote and gained many local offices in the late 19th century. In the late 19th century, a Populist-Republican coalition in several states gained governorships and some congressional seats in 1894. To prevent such a coalition from forming again and reduce election violence, the Democratic Party, dominant in all southern state legislatures, took action to disfranchise most blacks and many poor whites outright.

From 1890 to 1908, ten of the eleven former Confederate states completed political suppression and exclusion of these groups by ratifying new constitutions or amendments which incorporated provisions to make voter registration more difficult. These included such requirements as payment of poll taxes, complicated record keeping, complicated timing of registration and length of residency in relation to elections, with related record-keeping requirements; felony disenfranchisement focusing on crimes thought to be committed by African Americans, and a literacy test or comprehension test.

This was defended openly, on the floor of the Senate, by South Carolina Senator and former Governor Benjamin Tillman:

In my State there were 135,000 negro voters, or negroes of voting age, and some 90,000 or 95,000 white voters. ... Now, I want to ask you, with a free vote and a fair count, how are you going to beat 135,000 by 95,000? How are you going to do it? You had set us an impossible task.

We did not disfranchise the negroes until 1895. Then we had a constitutional convention convened which took the matter up calmly, deliberately, and avowedly with the purpose of disfranchising as many of them as we could under the Fourteenth and Fifteenth Amendments. We adopted the educational qualification as the only means left to us, and the negro is as contented and as prosperous and as well protected in South Carolina to-day as in any State of the Union south of the Potomac. He is not meddling with politics, for he found that the more he meddled with them the worse off he got. As to his "rights"—I will not discuss them now. We of the South have never recognized the right of the negro to govern white men, and we never will. ... I would to God the last one of them was in Africa and that none of them had ever been brought to our shores.

Prospective voters had to prove the ability to read and write the English language to white voter registrars, who in practice applied subjective requirements. Blacks were often denied the right to vote on this basis. Even well-educated blacks were often told they had "failed" such a test, if in fact, it had been administered. On the other hand, illiterate whites were sometimes allowed to vote through a "grandfather clause," which waived literacy requirements if one's grandfather had been a qualified voter before 1866, or had served as a soldier, or was from a foreign country. As most blacks had grandfathers who were slaves before 1866 and could not have fulfilled any of those conditions, they could not use the grandfather clause exemption. Selective enforcement of the poll tax was frequently also used to disqualify black and poor white voters. As a result of these measures, at the turn of the century voter rolls dropped markedly across the South. Most blacks and many poor whites were excluded from the political system for decades. Unable to vote, they were also excluded from juries or running for any office.

In Alabama, for example, its 1901 constitution restricted the franchise for poor whites as well as blacks. It contained requirements for payment of cumulative poll taxes, completion of literacy tests, and increased residency at state, county and precinct levels, effectively disenfranchising tens of thousands of poor whites as well as most blacks. Historian J. Morgan Kousser found, "They disfranchised these whites as willingly as they deprived blacks of the vote." By 1941, more whites than blacks in total had been disenfranchised.

=== Legal challenges to disfranchisement ===
Although African Americans quickly began legal challenges to such provisions in the 19th century, it was years before any were successful before the U.S. Supreme Court. Booker T. Washington, better known for his public stance of trying to work within societal constraints of the period at Tuskegee University, secretly helped fund and arrange representation for numerous legal challenges to disfranchisement. He called upon wealthy Northern allies and philanthropists to raise funds for the cause. The Supreme Court's upholding of Mississippi's new constitution, in Williams v. Mississippi (1898), encouraged other states to follow the Mississippi plan of disfranchisement. African Americans brought other legal challenges, as in Giles v. Harris (1903) and Giles v. Teasley (1904), but the Supreme Court upheld Alabama constitutional provisions. In 1915, Oklahoma was the last state to append a grandfather clause to its literacy requirement due to Supreme Court cases.

From early in the 20th century, the newly established National Association for the Advancement of Colored People (NAACP) took the lead in organizing or supporting legal challenges to segregation and disfranchisement. Gradually they planned the strategy of which cases to take forward. In Guinn v. United States (1915), the first case in which the NAACP filed a brief, the Supreme Court struck down the grandfather clause in Oklahoma and Maryland. Other states in which it was used had to retract their legislation as well. The challenge was successful.

But, nearly as rapidly as the Supreme Court determined a specific provision was unconstitutional, state legislatures developed new statutes to continue disenfranchisement. For instance, in Smith v. Allwright (1944), the Supreme Court struck down the use of state-sanctioned all-white primaries by the Southern Democrats. States developed new restrictions on black voting; Alabama passed a law giving county registrars more authority as to which questions they asked applicants in comprehension or literacy tests. The NAACP continued with steady progress in legal challenges to disenfranchisement and segregation.

In 1957, Congress passed the Civil Rights Act of 1957 to implement the Fifteenth Amendment. It established the United States Civil Rights Commission; among its duties is to investigate voter discrimination.

As late as 1962, programs such as Operation Eagle Eye in Arizona attempted to stymie minority voting through literacy tests. The Twenty-fourth Amendment was ratified in 1964 to prohibit poll taxes as a condition of voter registration and voting in federal elections. Many states continued to use them in state elections as a means of reducing the number of voters.

The American Civil Rights Movement, through such events as the Selma to Montgomery marches and Freedom Summer in Mississippi, gained passage by the United States Congress of the Voting Rights Act of 1965, which authorized federal oversight of voter registration and election practices and other enforcement of voting rights. Congress passed the legislation because it found "case by case litigation was inadequate to combat widespread and persistent discrimination in voting". Activism by African Americans helped secure an expanded and protected franchise that has benefited all Americans, including racial and language minorities.

The bill provided for federal oversight, if necessary, to ensure just voter registration and election procedures. The rate of African-American registration and voting in Southern states climbed dramatically and quickly, but it has taken years of federal oversight to work out the processes and overcome local resistance. In addition, it was not until the U.S. Supreme Court ruled 6–3 in Harper v. Virginia Board of Elections (1966) that all state poll taxes (for state elections) were officially declared unconstitutional as violating the Equal Protection Clause of the Fourteenth Amendment. This removed a burden on the poor.

Legal challenges have continued under the Voting Rights Act, primarily in areas of redistricting and election systems, for instance, challenging at-large election systems that effectively reduce the ability of minority groups to elect candidates of their choice. Such challenges have particularly occurred at the county and municipal level, including for school boards, where exclusion of minority groups and candidates at such levels has been persistent in some areas of the country. This reduces the ability of women and minorities to participate in the political system and gain entry-level experience.

== Asian Americans ==
Voting rights for Asian Americans have been continuously battled for in the United States since the initial significant wave of Asian immigration to the country in the mid-nineteenth century. The escalation of voting rights issues for Asian immigrants had started with the citizenship status of Chinese Americans from 1882 with the Chinese Exclusion Act that was inspired by and built upon the Naturalization Act of 1870. The latter act helped the judicial system decide a person's ethnicity, and if the person was white, they could proceed with the immigration process. While the Chinese Exclusion Act specifically targeted and banned the influx of Asian immigrants looking for work on the west coast due to the country that they were from and their ethnicity. Without the ability to become an American citizen, Asian immigrants were prohibited from voting or even immigrating to the United States during this time.

Things started to improve when the Chinese Exclusion Act was repealed in the mid-twentieth century, and Chinese immigrants were once again able to seek citizenship and voting rights. In spite of these setbacks, it was not a complete ban for Asian Americans; simultaneously, a minority of Asian Americans were politically active during this era of the 1870 Naturalization Act and Chinese exclusion. However, the Asian American community gained significant advancements in their voting rights later, with the McCarran-Walter Act of 1952. With this Act, the Asian American community was able to seek citizenship that was not on the basis of race but on a quota system that was dependent upon their country of emigration. Shortly after the McCarran-Walter Act, the Voting Rights Act was signed by President Lyndon B. Johnson in 1965. It thus came a new era of civil liberties for Asian Americans who were in the voting minority.

== Women ==
A parallel, yet separate, movement was that for women's suffrage. Leaders of the suffrage movement included Susan B. Anthony, Elizabeth Cady Stanton, Carrie Chapman Catt, and Alice Paul. In some ways this, too, could be said to have grown out of the American Civil War, as women had been strong leaders of the abolition movement. Middle- and upper-class women generally became more politically active in the northern tier during and after the war.

In 1848, the Seneca Falls Convention, the first women's rights convention, was held in Seneca Falls, New York. Of the 300 present, 68 women and 32 men signed the Declaration of Sentiments which defined the women's rights movement. The first National Women's Rights Convention took place in 1850 in Worcester, Massachusetts, attracting more than 1,000 participants. This national convention was held yearly through 1860.

When Susan B. Anthony and Elizabeth Cady Stanton formed the National Women Suffrage Association, their goal was to help women gain voting rights through reliance on the Constitution. Also, in 1869 Lucy Stone and Henry Blackwell formed the American Woman Suffrage Association (AWSA). However, AWSA focused on gaining voting rights for women through the amendment process. Although these two organization were fighting for the same cause, it was not until 1890 that they merged to form the National American Woman Suffrage Association (NAWSA). After the merger of the two organizations, the (NAWSA) waged a state-by-state campaign to obtain voting rights for women.

Following footsteps of early suffragists, several notable black women lawyers have also played a significant role in fighting for equal voting rights for women. These lawyers served to advocate for equal rights; over the last century, their legal efforts were focused heavily on addressing the discrimination and oppression of women of color, both stemming from racial and sex bias.

Wyoming was the first state in which women were able to vote, although it was a condition of the transition to statehood. Utah was the second territory to allow women to vote, but the federal Edmunds–Tucker Act of 1887 repealed woman's suffrage in Utah. Colorado was the first established state to allow women to vote on the same basis as men. Some other states also extended the franchise to women before the Constitution was amended to this purpose.

During the 1910s, Alice Paul, assisted by Lucy Burns and many others, organized such events and organizations as the 1913 Women's Suffrage Parade, the National Woman's Party, and the Silent Sentinels. At the culmination of the suffragists' requests and protests, ratification of the Nineteenth Amendment gave women the right to vote in time to participate in the Presidential election of 1920.

Another political movement that was largely driven by women in the same era was the anti-alcohol Temperance movement, which led to the Eighteenth Amendment and Prohibition.

== Military ==
Suffrage was never extended to members of the United States Armed Forces due to military status - individual members of the military received suffrage in accordance with the distinct categorical extensions that occurred throughout the nation's history. Matters pertaining to military members voting rights in elections in the United States have focused around two issues: absentee voting rights and requirements for nonpartisanship in election-related activities.

=== Absentee voting rights ===
Many military members stationed overseas were historically excluded from voting, de facto, due to state laws pertaining to absentee voting. Scholars have written that state-level policies to allow absentee voting for military members were often enacted when a political party in power thought that doing so would improve their reelection rates. For example, at the time of the American Civil War, it was widely believed that military members would vote Republican, and thus, states with Republican governors and legislatures tended to pass bills allowing military members to absentee vote or commission election officials to go to the battlefields and garrisons to collect votes. States with Democratic governors and legislatures tended not to pass such bills.

Similarly, a partisan controversy emerged over whether to simplify voting procedures to allow for absentee balloting for military members in the lead up to the 1944 elections, given that fewer than 2% of military members on active duty would be able to vote under current state laws at that time. The military and the general public were thought to be highly supportive of absentee ballot measures that would enable military members to vote while stationed overseas in active duty. However, following a December 1943 Gallup Poll reporting that military members would favor President Franklin D. Roosevelt (a Democrat) by 61 percent, and the belief that the military vote could swing the upcoming election, a fairly split Seventy-eighth Congress was slow to pass measures to enfranchise military members stationed overseas. Generally, Democrats favored enabling absentee ballot procedures for military members, believing that a majority of the members of the armed forces would support their party, while Republicans were generally opposed, believing that their reelection would be disadvantaged. An exception to this pattern was that Southern Democrats tended to oppose the measures because it would enfranchise thousands of persons who were disqualified under state laws, such as Black Americans. The initial legislation (the Green-Lucas Bill) was rejected, and Congress instead passed a measure (which became Public Law 712) that made ballots contingent upon state certification.

Federal legislation, such as the Uniformed and Overseas Citizens Absentee Voting Act (UOCAVA) of 1986 and the Military and Overseas Voter Empowerment (MOVE) Act of 2010 have removed the power from the states to control absentee voting regulations for military members --- military members are now able to absentee vote, no matter where they are stationed.

=== Non-partisanship in election-related activities ===
Military members are required to publicly maintain a nonpartisan stance on political matters while acting in their official capacity - they may not engage in activities that associate the Department of Defense with any partisan political campaign or elections, candidate, cause or issue. The Department of Defense Directive 1344.10 and the Hatch Act outline that members of the armed forces who are on active duty are permitted to express their personal opinions on political candidates, make a monetary contribution to a campaign, sign a petition to place a candidate's name on the ballot, and attend a political event as a spectator. Members on active duty may not participate in partisan activities such as soliciting or engaging in partisan fundraiser activities, serving as the sponsor of a partisan club, or speaking before a partisan gathering. In addition, all military members, including National Guard and Reserve forces, are prohibited from wearing military uniforms at political campaign events. The Hatch Act allows most federal employees to actively participate in political activities outside of the workplace. There are, however, significant restrictions on fundraising, running for office in partisan elections and using one's authority in the political arena. Senate-confirmed presidential appointees and career and non-career Senior Executive Service employees are subject to additional limitations.

Some notable military members, including William Tecumseh Sherman, George C. Marshall, and David Petraeus, claim that they did not vote in U.S. presidential elections. The three, along with many officers from Marshall's generation, abstained from voting in order to avoid any sense of partisanship that could impair their professional judgement.

== Washington, D.C. ==
Washington, D.C., was created from a portion of the states of Maryland and Virginia in 1801. The Virginia portion was retroceded (returned) to Virginia upon request of the residents, by an Act of Congress in 1846 to protect slavery, and restore state and federal voting rights in that portion of Virginia. When Maryland delegated a portion of its land to Congress so it could be used as the Nation's capital, Congress did not continue Maryland Voting Laws. It canceled all state and federal elections starting with 1802. Local elections limped on in some neighborhoods, until 1871, when local elections were also forbidden by the U.S. Congress. The U.S. Congress is the National Legislature. Under Article I, Section 8, Clause 17, Congress has the sole authority to exercise "Exclusive Legislature in all cases whatsoever" over the nation's capital and over federal military bases. Active disfranchisement is typically a States Rights Legislative issue, where the removal of voting rights is permitted. At the national level, the federal government typically ignored voting rights issues, or affirmed that they were extended.

Congress, when exercising "exclusive legislation" over U.S. Military Bases in the United States, and Washington, D.C., viewed its power as strong enough to remove all voting rights. All state and federal elections were canceled by Congress in D.C. and all of Maryland's voting Rights laws no longer applied to D.C. when Maryland gave up that land. Congress did not pass laws to establish local voting processes in the District of Columbia. This omission of law strategy to disfranchise is contained in the Congressional debates in Annals of Congress in 1800 and 1801.

In 1986, the US Congress voted to restore voting rights on U.S. Military bases for all state and federal elections.

D.C. citizens were granted the right to vote in Presidential elections in 1961 after ratification of the Twenty-third Amendment. The citizens and territory converted in 1801 were represented by John Chew Thomas from Maryland's 2nd, and William Craik from Maryland's 3rd Congressional Districts, which were redrawn and removed from the city.

Since 1801, the people of this area have not had representation in Congress. Congress created a non-voting delegate to the House of Representatives between 1871 and 1875, but then abolished that post as well. Congress permitted restoration of local elections and home rule for the District on December 24, 1973. In 1971, Congress still opposed restoring a Representative in the House for Washington, D.C. That year it re-established the position of non-voting Delegate to the U.S. Congress.

== Young adults ==
17-year-olds whose 18th birthday is before the general election may vote in primaries and caucuses in the states shown in blue, but only in presidential caucuses in the states shown in pink.

A third voting rights movement was won in the 1960s to lower the voting age from twenty-one to eighteen. Activists noted that most of the young men who were being drafted to fight in the Vietnam War were too young to have any voice in the selection of the leaders who were sending them to fight. Some states had already lowered the voting age: notably Georgia, Kentucky, and Hawaii, had already permitted voting by persons younger than twenty-one.

The Twenty-sixth Amendment, ratified in 1971, prohibits federal and state laws which set a minimum voting age higher than 18 years. As of 2008, no state has opted for an earlier age, although some state governments have discussed it. California has, since the 1980s, allowed persons who are 17 to register to vote for an election where the election itself will occur on or after their 18th birthday, and several states including Indiana allow 17-year-olds to vote in a primary election provided they will be 18 by the general election.

== Prisoners ==
Unrestricted Ends after release (Note: In American Samoa, one has to be on "good behavior" for two years before their enfranchisement, regardless if they are on probation or parole.) Ends after parole Ends after probation Circumstantial Individual petitions required

Prisoner voting rights are defined by individual states, and the laws are different from state to state. Some states allow only individuals on probation to vote. Others allow individuals on parole and probation. As of 2012, only Florida, Kentucky and Virginia continue to impose a lifelong denial of the right to vote to all citizens with a felony record, absent a restoration of rights granted by the Governor or state legislature. However, in Kentucky, a felon's rights can be restored after the completion of a restoration process to regain civil rights.

In 2007, the Florida Legislature restored voting rights to convicted felons who had served their sentences. In March 2011, however, Governor Rick Scott reversed the 2007 reforms. He signed legislation that permanently disenfranchises citizens with past felony convictions. After the 2018 Florida Amendment 4 referendum, however, Florida residents voted to restore voting rights to roughly 1.4 million felons who have completed their sentences.

In July 2005, Iowa Governor Tom Vilsack issued an executive order restoring the right to vote for all persons who have completed supervision. On October 31, 2005, the Iowa Supreme Court upheld mass reenfranchisement of convicted felons. Nine other states disenfranchise felons for various lengths of time following the completion of their probation or parole.

Other than Maine and Vermont, all U.S. states prohibit felons from voting while they are in prison. In Puerto Rico, felons in prison are allowed to vote in elections.

Practices in the United States are in contrast to some European nations that allow prisoners to vote, while other European countries have restrictions on voting while serving a prison sentence, but not after release. Prisoners have been allowed to vote in Canada since 2002.

The United States has a higher proportion of its population in prison than any other Western nation, and more than Russia or China. The dramatic rise in the rate of incarceration in the United States, a 500% increase from the 1970s to the 1990s, has vastly increased the number of people disenfranchised because of the felon provisions.

According to the Sentencing Project, as of 2010 an estimated 5.9 million Americans are denied the right to vote because of a felony conviction, a number equivalent to 2.5% of the U.S. voting-age population and a sharp increase from the 1.2 million people affected by felony disenfranchisement in 1976. Given the prison populations, the effects have been most disadvantageous for minority and poor communities.

== Duration of residency and registration ==
The Supreme Court of the United States struck down a one-year residency requirement to vote in Dunn v. Blumstein 405 U.S. 330 (1972), ruling that limits on voter registration of up to 30 to 50 days prior to an election were permissible for logistical reasons, but that residency requirements in excess of that violated the Equal Protection Clause under the Fourteenth Amendment. The states of Idaho, Maine, Michigan, Minnesota, Wisconsin, and Wyoming allow same-day voter registration on Election Day. North Dakota does not require voters to register.

== Disability ==
In some states, people who are deemed mentally incompetent are not allowed to vote. Voting rights specialist Michelle Bishop has said, "We are the last demographic within the U.S. where you can take away our right to vote because of our identity."

In the conservatorship process, people can lose their right to vote in 39 states and Washington, D.C. if they are deemed "incapacitated" or "incompetent." In California, SB 589 was passed in 2015, which created the presumption that those under conservatorship can vote.

== Homelessness ==
In the 1980s, homelessness was recognized as an increasing national problem. By the early 21st century, there have been numerous court cases to help protect the voting rights of persons without a fixed address. Low income and homeless citizens face some obstacles in registering to vote. These obstacles include establishing residency, providing a mailing address, and showing proof of identification. Residency requirements vary from state to state.

All potential voters have faced new requirements since 2002, when President George W. Bush signed the Help America Vote Act (HAVA). It requires voters to provide their driver's license numbers, or the last four digits of their Social Security Number on their voter registration form. This has been enforced.

== Special interest elections ==
Several locales retained restrictions for specialized local elections, such as for school boards, special districts, or bond issues. Property restrictions, duration of residency restrictions, and, for school boards, restrictions of the franchise to voters with children, remained in force. In a series of rulings from 1969 to 1973, the Court ruled that the franchise could be restricted in some cases to those "primarily interested" or "primarily affected" by the outcome of a specialized election, but not in the case of school boards or bond issues, which affected taxation to be paid by all residents. In Ball v. James 451 U.S. 335 (1981), the Court further upheld a system of plural voting, by which votes for the board of directors of a water reclamation district were allocated on the basis of a person's proportion of land owned in the district.

The Court has overseen operation of political party primaries to ensure open voting. While states were permitted to require voters to register for a political party 30 days before an election, or to require them to vote in only one party primary, the state could not prevent a voter from voting in a party primary if the voter has voted in another party's primary in the last 23 months. The Court also ruled that a state may not mandate a "closed primary" system and bar independents from voting in a party's primary against the wishes of the party. (Tashijan v. Republican Party of Connecticut 479 U.S. 208 (1986))

The Office of Hawaiian Affairs of the state of Hawaii, created in 1978, limited voting eligibility and candidate eligibility to native Hawaiians on whose behalf it manages 1,800,000 acres (7,300 km^{2}) of ceded land. The Supreme Court of the United States struck down the franchise restriction under the Fifteenth Amendment in Rice v. Cayetano 528 U.S. 495 (2000), following by eliminating the candidate restriction in Arakaki v. State of Hawai'i a few months later.

== Current status by region ==
=== District of Columbia ===
Citizens of the nation's capital, Washington, D.C., have not been apportioned a representative or US senator in Congress. This is because D.C. is a federal district and not a state and, under the Constitution, only states are apportioned congresspersons.

District of Columbia citizens had voting rights removed in 1801 by Congress, when Maryland delegated that portion of its land to Congress. Congress incrementally removed effective local control or home rule by 1871. It restored some home rule in 1971, but maintained the authority to override any local laws. Washington, D.C., does not have full representation in the U.S. House or Senate. The Twenty-third Amendment, restoring U.S. Presidential Election after a 164-year-gap, is the only known limit to Congressional "exclusive legislature" from Article I-8-17, forcing Congress to enforce for the first time Amendments 14, 15, 19, 24, and 26. It gave the District of Columbia three electors and hence the right to vote for President, but not full U.S. Congresspersons nor U.S. Senators. In 1978, another amendment was proposed which would have restored to the District a full seat, but it failed to receive ratification by a sufficient number of states within the seven years required.

As of 2013, a bill is pending in Congress that would treat the District of Columbia as "a congressional district for purposes of representation in the House of Representatives", and permit United States citizens residing in the capital to vote for a member to represent them in the House of Representatives. The District of Columbia House Voting Rights Act, S. 160, 111th Cong. was passed by the U.S. Senate on February 26, 2009, by a vote of 61–37.

On April 1, 1993, the Inter-American Commission on Human Rights of the Organization of American States received a petition from Timothy Cooper on behalf of the Statehood Solidarity Committee (the "Petitioners") against the government of the United States (the "State" or "United States"). The petition indicated that it was presented on behalf of the members of the Statehood Solidarity Committee and all other U.S. citizens resident in the District of Columbia. The petition alleged that the United States was responsible for violations of Articles II (right to equality before law) and XX (right to vote and to participate in government) of the American Declaration of the Rights and Duties of Man in connection with the inability of citizens of the District of Columbia to vote for and elect a representative to the U.S. Congress. On December 29, 2003, The Inter-American Commission on Human Rights having examined the information and arguments provided by the parties on the question of admissibility. Without prejudging the merits of the matter, the Commission decided to admit the present petition in respect of Articles II and XX of the American Declaration. In addition, the Commission concluded that the United States violates the Petitioners' rights under Articles II and XX of the American Declaration of the Rights and Duties of Man by denying District of Columbia citizens an effective opportunity to participate in their federal legislature.

=== Overseas and nonresident citizens ===
The Overseas Citizens Voting Rights Act of 1976 was the first bill to enshrine the constitutional right to vote in federal elections into law for U.S. citizens living overseas. This bill also established uniform absentee voting procedures for U.S. citizens living overseas in federal elections. The right to vote in the federal elections in the state they most recently lived in before emigrating from the United States was extended to citizens living overseas, provided that they met all the criteria to vote in the federal elections when they resided in the U.S., only excluding the age requirement. To reduce voting fraud, the bill included provisions preventing overseas citizens from voting by absentee ballot in multiple states.

The Uniformed and Overseas Citizens Absentee Voting Act (UOCAVA) of 1986 consolidated and recodified the Overseas Citizens Voting Rights Act and the Federal Voting Assistance Act. The UOCAVA requires that states and territories allow certain groups of U.S. citizens to vote in federal elections. This bill ensures that overseas citizens can register to vote and request an absentee ballot simultaneously through the Federal Post Card Application, making the process of voting overseas easier.

The Secretary of Defense is responsible for the administrative implementation of this bill; the Secretary of Defense has delegated the responsibilities of ensuring the safety and security of overseas voting to the Federal Voting Assistance Program (FVAP). The FVAP works together with individual states to ensure that overseas citizens have full opportunity to participate in Federal elections. While states can expand upon the voting rights of overseas citizens, they cannot pass legislation that reduces the rights conferred to overseas citizens under UOCAVA.

Under UOCAVA, overseas citizens vote in the state that they last resided in before leaving the U.S. Additionally, 38 states and the District of Columbia currently have provisions that allow the children of U.S. citizens, who themselves are citizens, to vote in the federal elections in the state their parents last resided in before departing from the U.S. Given that the federal act did not include the right for citizens that have never resided in the U.S., individual states must codify these provisions.

In 2009, the Military and Overseas Voting Empowerment Act ("MOVE Act") was passed, which amended the UOCAVA to establish new voter registration and absentee ballot procedures which all states must follow for federal elections. This Act included online forms of absentee ballot requests and voting mechanisms and expanded the ability and made it easier to vote overseas.

=== U.S. territories ===
U.S. citizens and non-citizen nationals who reside in American Samoa, Guam, Northern Mariana Islands, Puerto Rico, or the United States Virgin Islands are not allowed to vote in U.S. national and presidential elections, as these U.S. territories belong to the United States but do not have presidential electors. The U.S. Constitution requires a voter to be resident in one of the 50 states or in the District of Columbia to vote in federal elections. To say that the Constitution does not require extension of federal voting rights to U.S. territories residents does not, however, exclude the possibility that the Constitution may permit their enfranchisement under another source of law. Statehood or a constitutional amendment would allow people in the U.S. territories to vote in federal elections.

Like the District of Columbia, territories of the United States do not have U.S. senators representing them in the Senate, and they each have one member of the House of Representatives who is not allowed to vote.

These voting restrictions have been challenged in a series of lawsuits in the 21st century. In 2015, residents of Guam, Puerto Rico, and the Virgin Islands joined as plaintiffs in Segovia v. Board of Election Commissioners (201 F. Supp. 3d 924, 939, N.D. Ill., 2016). The participants had all formerly lived in Illinois, but because of a change of residency to an unincorporated territory were no longer able to vote. Their claim was that the Uniformed and Overseas Citizens Absentee Voting Act, as it is implemented, violates the Equal Protection Clause. At issue was that Illinois, the former residence of all of the plaintiffs, allowed residents of the Northern Mariana Islands who had formerly lived in Illinois to vote as absentee voters, but denied former residents living in other unincorporated territories the same right. The U.S. District Court for the Northern District of Illinois ruled in 2016 that under the Absentee Voting Act, former residents of US states are entitled to vote in elections of the last jurisdiction in which they qualified to vote, as long as they reside in a foreign location. Using rational basis review, the court stated that the Northern Mariana Islands had a unique relationship with the United States and could be treated differently. It further pointed out that as the law does not differentiate between residents within a territory, as to who formerly resided in a state, but all are treated equally, no violation occurred. The United States Court of Appeals for the Seventh Circuit concurred with the decision, but dismissed the case for lack of standing because the application of the Absentee Voting Act in Illinois is a state issue.

In 2019, John Fitisemanu of American Samoa challenged his inability to vote because of his status as a non-citizen national of the United States. Though Fitisemanu had lived and paid taxes in Utah for twenty years, and had a U.S. passport, he was unable to vote. The United States District Court for the District of Utah, ruled in Fitisemanu v. United States (No. 18-36, D. Utah Dec. 13, 2019) that individuals born in American Samoa are birthright citizens under Section 1 of the Fourteenth Amendment to the United States Constitution. The day following the ruling, Fitisemanu registered to vote, but as the ruling was stayed pending an appeal filed in the United States Court of Appeals for the Tenth Circuit, he was still unable to participate in casting a ballot. In 2021, a divided panel of the United States Court of Appeals for the Tenth Circuit ruled in Fitisemanu v. United States (No. 20-4017, 10th Cir. 2021) that neither the Constitution nor Supreme Court precedent demands the district court's decision, and reversed it. Ahead of the 2020 elections, citizens from the Virgin Islands and Guam, who had formerly lived in Hawaii, instituted an action, Reeves v. United States, challenging their lack of voting rights.

==== Puerto Rico ====
Puerto Rico is an insular area—a United States territory that is neither a part of one of the fifty states nor a part of the District of Columbia, the nation's federal district. Insular areas, such as Puerto Rico, the U.S. Virgin Islands and Guam, are not allowed to choose electors in U.S. presidential elections or elect voting members to the U.S. Congress. This grows out of Article I and Article II of the United States Constitution, which specifically mandate that electors are to be chosen by "the People of the several States". In 1961, the Twenty-third Amendment extended the right to choose electors to the District of Columbia.

Any U.S. citizen who resides in Puerto Rico (whether a Puerto Rican or not) is effectively disenfranchised at the national level. Although the Republican Party and Democratic Party chapters in Puerto Rico have selected voting delegates to the national nominating conventions participating in U.S. presidential primaries or caucuses, U.S. citizens not residing in one of the 50 states or in the District of Columbia may not vote in federal elections.

Various scholars (including a prominent U.S. judge in the United States Court of Appeals for the First Circuit) conclude that the U.S. national-electoral process is not fully democratic due to U.S. government disenfranchisement of U.S. citizens residing in Puerto Rico.

As of 2010, under Igartúa v. United States, the International Covenant on Civil and Political Rights (ICCPR) is judicially considered not to be self-executing, and therefore requires further legislative action to put it into effect domestically. Judge Kermit Lipez wrote in a concurring opinion, however, that the en banc majority's conclusion that the ICCPR is non-self-executing is ripe for reconsideration in a new en banc proceeding, and that if issues highlighted in a partial dissent by Judge Juan R. Torruella were to be decided in favor of the plaintiffs, United States citizens residing in Puerto Rico would have a viable claim to equal voting rights.

From the First Circuit decision:

Congress has in fact acted in partial compliance with its obligations under the ICCPR when, in 1961, just a few years after the United Nations first ratified the ICCPR, it amended our fundamental charter to allow the United States citizens who reside in the District of Columbia to vote for the Executive offices. See U.S. Const. amend. XXIII. Indeed, a bill is now pending in Congress that would treat the District of Columbia as "a congressional district for purposes of representation in the House of Representatives," and permit United States citizens residing in the capitol to vote for members of the House of Representatives. See District of Columbia House Voting Rights Act, S.160, 111th Cong. (passed by Senate, February 26, 2009) (2009). However, the United States has not taken similar "steps" with regard to the five million United States citizens who reside in the other U.S. territories, of which close to four million are residents of Puerto Rico. This inaction is in clear violation of the United States' obligations under the ICCPR.

== Accessibility ==
Federal legislation such as the Americans with Disabilities Act of 1990 (ADA), the National Voter Registration Act of 1993 (NVRA, or "Motor-Voter Act") and the Help America Vote Act of 2002 (HAVA) help to address some of the concerns of disabled and non-English speaking voters in the United States.

Some studies have shown that polling places are inaccessible to disabled voters. The Federal Election Commission reported that, in violation of state and federal laws, more than 20,000 polling places across the nation are inaccessible, depriving people with disabilities of their fundamental right to vote.

In 1999, the Attorney General of the State of New York ran a check of polling places around the state to see if they were accessible to voters with disabilities and found many problems. A study of three upstate counties of New York found fewer than 10 percent of polling places fully compliant with state and federal laws.

Many polling booths are set in church basements or in upstairs meeting halls where there are no ramps or elevators. This means problems not just for people who use wheelchairs, but for people using canes or walkers too. And in most states people who are blind do not have access to Braille ballot to vote; they have to bring someone along to vote for them. Studies have shown that people with disabilities are more interested in government and public affairs than most and are more eager to participate in the democratic process. Many election officials urge people with disabilities to vote absentee, however some disabled individuals see this as an inferior form of participation.

Voter turnout is lower among disabled people. In the 2012 United States presidential election 56.8% of people with disabilities reported voting, compared to the 62.5% of eligible citizens without disabilities.

However, there are options to cast a ballot prior to election day which provide greater accessibility, such as mail-in ballots and early voting. For example, mail-in ballots offer greater accessibility for people who may have trouble physically accessing a polling place, as well as for people whose busy work schedules or home lives prevent them from being able to vote on election day. These options to vote before election day are widely used. According to research by the Center for Election Innovation & Research, in 2020, 69% of ballots were cast prior to election day. Not all states have these options available, or available without an excuse, but 97% of voting-eligible citizens live in states that have access to at least one option to vote prior to election day.

== Right to candidacy ==
Citizenship requirements to become governor of a US State: (green) no citizenship requirement, (yellow) citizenship is required, (orange) citizenship for X years is required

Jurisprudence concerning candidacy rights and the rights of citizens to create a political party are less clear than voting rights. Different courts have reached different conclusions regarding what sort of restrictions, often in terms of ballot access, public debate inclusion, filing fees, and residency requirements, may be imposed.

In Williams v. Rhodes (1968), the United States Supreme Court struck down Ohio ballot access laws on First and Fourteenth Amendment grounds. However, it subsequently upheld such laws in several other cases. States can require an independent or minor party candidate to collect signatures as high as five percent of the total votes cast in a particular preceding election before the court will intervene.

The Supreme Court has also upheld a state ban on cross-party endorsements (also known as electoral fusion) and primary write-in votes.

State constitutions have varying requirements for the length of citizenship and residency of the governor but unlike the President, state governors do not need to be natural-born citizens. There is some ambiguity in some state constitutions if a governor must be a citizen or just a resident.

== Voter identification laws ==
Voter ID laws by state, as of August 2025: Photo ID required (Strict) Photo ID requested (Non-strict) Non-photo ID required (Strict) Non-photo ID requested (Non-strict) No ID required to vote

Voter identification laws in the United States are laws that require a person to provide some form of official identification before they are permitted to register to vote, receive a ballot for an election, or to actually vote in elections in the United States.

Proponents of voter identification laws argue that they reduce electoral fraud while placing only little burden on voters. Opponents say fraud is extremely rare, and ID requirements intentionally create bureaucratic barriers in order to suppress the votes of specific populations, such as poor people or college students.

== Noncitizen voting ==
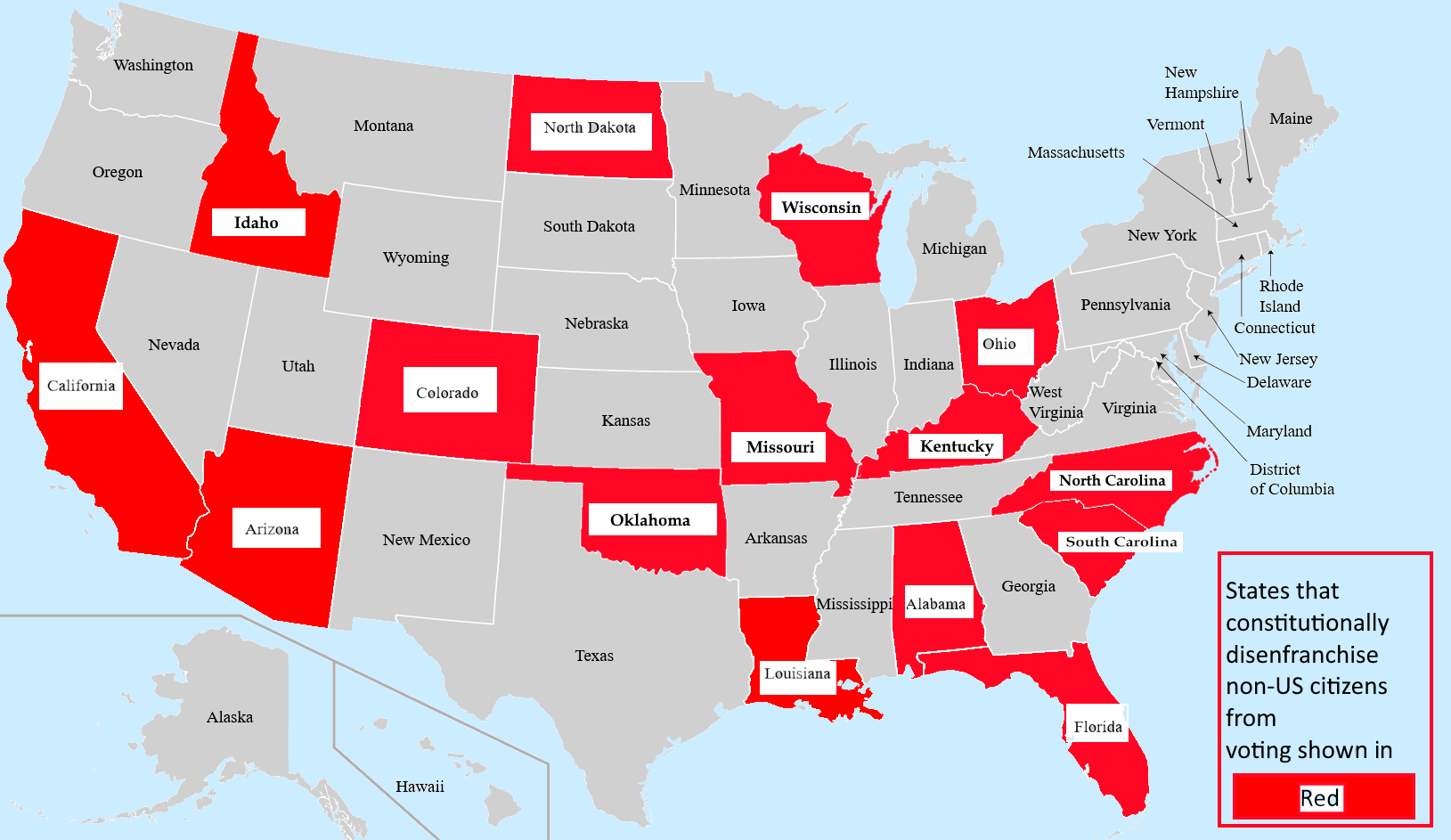
Map of US States where in their constitutions they specify that only U.S. citizens can vote as of 2023

More than 40 states or territories, including colonies before the Declaration of Independence, have at some time allowed noncitizens who satisfied residential requirements to vote in some or all elections. This in part reflected the strong continuing immigration to the United States. Some cities like Chicago, towns or villages (in Maryland) today allow noncitizen residents to vote in school or local elections. (Note: See also Droit de vote des étrangers aux États-Unis (in French).) In 1875, the Supreme Court in Minor v. Happersett noted that "citizenship has not in all cases been made a condition precedent to the enjoyment of the right of suffrage. Thus, in Missouri, persons of foreign birth, who have declared their intention to become citizens of the United States, may under certain circumstances vote". Federal law prohibits noncitizens from voting in federal elections. Penalties for voting as a non-citizen may include up to 1 year in federal prison and/or a fine, loss of lawful permanent resident status, deportability with no general waiver, denial of naturalization, among other consequences that apply whether the vote was cast intentionally or by mistake.

As of 2022, Five state constitutions specifically state that "only" a citizen can vote in an election–Alabama, Arizona, Colorado, Florida, and North Dakota. With Louisiana and Ohio having a ballot measure in the same year.

== Other proposed voting reforms ==
- Federal restrictions or enforcement against voter suppression techniques
- Restrict gerrymandering with politically independent redistricting, or changing to at-large proportional representation
- Adopt ranked-choice voting, approval voting, or other system
- Abolish the Electoral College
- Make Election Day a holiday or weekend, or expand early voting to increase turnout
- Amend the Constitution to guarantee the right to vote in general, rather than only prohibiting certain forms of discrimination. Voting in state and Congressional elections can be severely restricted by state laws, and Electoral College votes can be made by state legislatures alone if they so choose. Congress often does not use its power to enforce the existing Constitutional protections; an amendment could require courts to do so more directly.
- Automatic universal voter registration

== See also ==
- Civil Rights Act of 1960 – United States law
- iVote – U.S. voting rights organization
- List of suffragists and suffragettes – People who campaigned for women's right to vote
- Lodge Bill – 1890 election bill proposed in the U.S. Congress
- Timeline of women's suffrage
- Women's poll tax repeal movement – Movement to abolish US poll taxes
