= United States non-resident eligible voters =

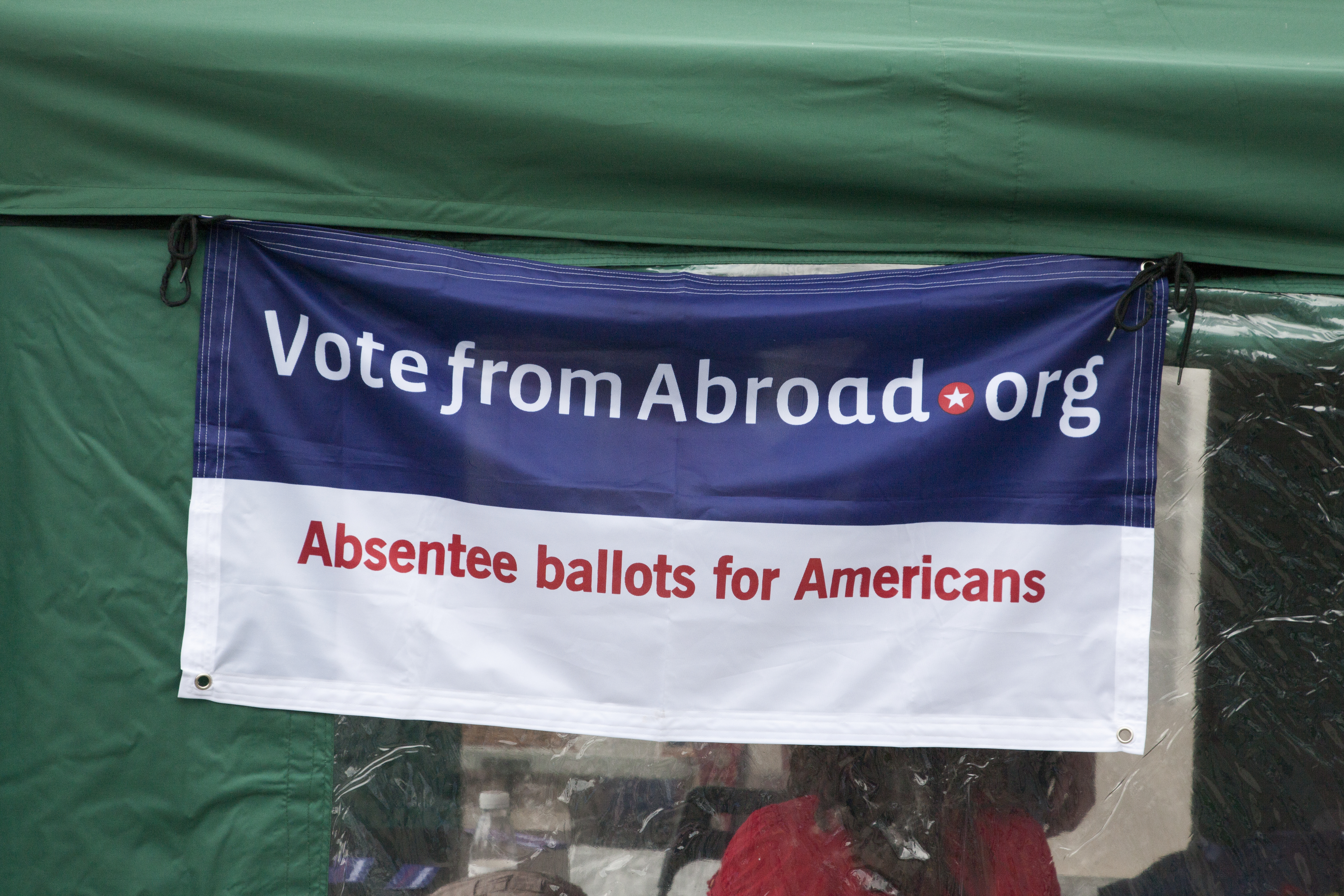
Absentee ballots for Americans at the Maritime Festival in Dublin

U.S. non-resident eligible voters during the midterm election in 2022 have been estimated at 2.8 million. However the absentee ballots received (cast votes) approximated to ninety-five thousand, the equivalent of 3.4% of non-resident voters. The main reason for voters abroad not casting the ballot was difficulties with the voting process, but also lack of connection with U.S. policy and the risk of exposure to U.S. local taxation.

== Overseas Citizen Voting-Age Population ==
The Federal Voting Assistance Program (FVAP) designates the U.S. non-resident voters with the acronym OCVAP “Overseas Citizen Voting-Age Population” that are U.S. civilians and military entitled to an absentee ballot to be sent abroad. Since a single registry of U.S. non-residents does not exist, OCVAP is calculated taking the data from the Database on Immigrants in OECD Countries (DIOC) compared with IPUMS International data.

As of February 2016, the FVAP publishes the Overseas Citizen Population Analysis.

2022 Overseas Citizen Population Analysis (OCPA) (Note: In 2022 the FVAP changed the methods to estimate the number of citizens abroad and eligible to vote. The FVAP recommends to use the figures published in 2022 for comparisons with previous OCPA reports.)
| Year | Election | Est. citizens abroad | Est. eligible to vote | Est. votes | Voting rate |
|---|---|---|---|---|---|
| 2010 | Midterm | 3,099,088 | 1,907,624 | N/a | N/a |
| 2012 | Presidential | 3,346,920 | 2,087,843 | 136,280 | 5.4% |
| 2014 | Midterm | 3,508,009 | 2,204,857 | 94,809 | 4.3% |
| 2016 | Presidential | 3,684,898 | 2,248,832 | 206,893 | 9.2% |
| 2018 | Midterm | 3,921,952 | 2,422,122 | 135,639 | 5.6% |
| 2020 | Presidential | 3,991,358 | 2,489,074 | 224,017 | 9.0% |
| 2022 | Midterm | 4,397,534 | 2,794,558 | 94,927 | 3.4% |
