= DiDomenico =

DiDomenico is a surname. Notable people with this surname include:

- Chris DiDomenico (born 1989), a Canadian ice hockey player
- Raquel DiDomenico (born 1980), an American combat engineer
- Sal DiDomenico (born 1971), an American local politician for Massachusetts
