= U.S. Vote Foundation =

U.S. non-profit organization

- Established: 2005
- Chair: Michael Steele
- President & CEO: Susan Dzieduszycka-Suinat
- Address: 4325 Old Glebe Road; Arlington, VA 22207
- Location: Arlington, Virginia
- Website: usvotefoundation.org

The U.S. Vote Foundation (U.S. Vote) is a non-partisan non-profit 501(c)(3) voter assistance and civic tech organization that helps United States citizens, domestically, overseas, or in the military, participate in elections by providing public access to internet-based voter services. The organization was originally founded as the Overseas Vote Foundation (Overseas Vote) in 2005 by Susan Dzieduszycka-Suinat and other United States citizens living abroad as a way to assist overseas voters in exercising rights protected under the Uniformed and Overseas Citizens Absentee Voting Act (UOCAVA). In 2012, U.S. Vote was founded and expanded to include voting services for domestic voters. Overseas Vote remains an initiative of U.S. Vote.

== Mission ==
U.S. Vote offers its data for use by third-party voter outreach organizations, voter apps and services developers, academics, and other researchers.

Original logo of the Overseas Vote Foundation

U.S. Vote's key activities are:

- Developing tools and services that simplify the overseas and military voter registration process and ballot request process.
- Licensing customized voter services applications to states and voting organizations.
- Providing outreach to voters through an ongoing communications program.
- Conducting research and surveys of U.S. citizens regarding the overseas and military voter registration and absentee ballot process.

== Voter services and site usage ==
U.S. Vote provides services for voters in all states and territories. Overseas U.S. citizens, U.S. State Department employees, and active duty uniformed service members and their accompanying families, within and outside of the United States can register to vote from abroad and request their ballots using U.S. Vote's suite of voter services.

U.S. Vote licenses its data, including contact information for approximately 8,000 local election offices, to partners such as the U.S. Postal Service, the National Association of Secretaries of State, Rock the Vote, Vote.org, and some corporations (ExxonMobil, for instance, licenses a custom website to help its overseas workers access absentee ballots).

In November 2015, the organization's Local/Municipal Election Dates and Deadlines Data Management System and API were selected for the Knight Foundation's Prototype Fund. It aims to create a nationwide system to collect, maintain, and distribute information on upcoming local election dates and deadlines.

U.S. Vote had 2.6 million visits in 2016 on two portals that the group maintains. The organization has seen a 400 percent increase in ballot requests on its system since 2012.

Through U.S Vote's websites, voters have access to registration information, a downloadable Federal Write-In Absentee Ballot (Vote-Print-Mail Ballot), state-specific voter information directory (SVID), a local election official directory, and a "voter help-desk." In total, the organization's voter services include the following:

- Absentee Voter Registration and Ballot Request: customized by state
- Federal Write-In Absentee Ballot (Vote-Print-Mail Ballot Service): provides automated write-in ballot with candidate lists
- Election Official Directory Services: complete election office contact database
- State Voter Information Directory Service: provides dates, deadlines, and contact information by state
- Voter Help Desk: instant response system knowledge base and personal help services
- My Voter Account: personal democracy dashboard
- Mailing List: voters can opt-in to join the mailing list and receive Voter Alerts

== Additional information ==
OVF and U.S. Vote also offer the following:

- Hosted Systems Program: This program licenses the full suite of OVF tools or USVF tools customized for a state, county, or voting organization, which can then be utilized as their own domestic and/or overseas and military voter services as a fully hosted solution.
- Research Program: The organization conducts post-election survey research with voters and election officials regarding overseas and military voting.
- Annual Voting & Elections Summit: This annual conference features a range of elections and technology speakers in the fields of voting and elections policies, processes, and technologies.

== Financials ==
In 2020, the U.S. Vote Foundation reported $832,306 in total revenue and $508,418 in total assets. 80.8% of the foundation's total revenue in 2020 came from contributions.

== See also ==
- Absentee ballot
