= Victims of Iranian Censorship Act =

Victims of Iranian Censorship Act, more popularly called as the VOICE Act, is the Subtitle D of Title XII of Public Law 111-84, the National Defense Authorization Act for Fiscal Year 2010, USA., legitimately passed and signed on October 28, 2009. On January 21, 2010, according to the spirit of this Act, United States Secretary of State Hillary Clinton delivered a public speech "On Internet Freedom," exploring positive aspects of Internet freedom and emphasizing that,

"But the vision of a world in which all people enjoyed freedom of expression, freedom of worship, freedom from want, and freedom from fear transcended the troubles of his day. […] Today, we find an urgent need to protect these freedoms on the digital frontiers of the 21st century. There are many other networks in the world. Some aid in the movement of people or resources, and some facilitate exchanges between individuals with the same work or interests. But the internet is a network that magnifies the power and potential of all others. And that's why we believe it's critical that its users are assured certain basic freedoms. Freedom of expression is first among them."

On April 1, 2010, President of the United States Barack Obama endorsed a letter for a report to ensure the free flow of information to Iran and to enhance the abilities of Iranians to exercise their universal rights. Thus, the VOICE Act has become one of the principles of USA policy both domestically and diplomatically.

== See also ==
- National Defense Authorization Act
- Department of Homeland Security Appropriations Act, 2010
  - American Communities' Right to Public Information Act
  - OPEN FOIA Act of 2009
  - Protected National Security Documents Act of 2009
