= Military and Overseas Voter Empowerment Act =

Act of the United States Congress

The Military and Overseas Voter Empowerment Act (or MOVE Act) is Subtitle H of the National Defense Authorization Act for Fiscal Year 2010 (H.R. 2647, Pub. L. 111–84 (text) (PDF), 123 Stat. 2190.) and was an act of Congress signed into law by U.S. President Barack Obama on 28 October 2009. The law amended various provisions of the Uniformed and Overseas Citizens Absentee Voting Act (UOCAVA), which was passed in 1986 to centralize all previous federal laws concerning absentee voting for military and overseas voters.

The overall purpose of the MOVE Act is to help military serving overseas and citizens who live abroad vote in U.S. elections more effectively. Most provisions apply to the November 2010 elections. A notable exception is the requirement (in Subsection E) that requires states to allow "a UOCAVA voter to enter his/her address or other information relevant to the local election jurisdiction and receive a list of all candidates for Federal office in that jurisdiction".

The current law has three core components:

- technology: the mandatory use of technology to transmit election materials to military and overseas voters, including the electronic delivery of blank ballots and electronic tracking systems;
- communications: the use of online communication using websites and email correspondence; and,
- election administration: blank ballot distribution to voters 45 days before election day.

The focus on technology, especially in the transmission of ballots, is driven by previous experience where as much as one-fifth of the military and overseas voters were unable to return their ballots on time.

While implementation of the act has been spotty, a report by the Overseas Vote Foundation released in January 2013 states that, "the MOVE Act has begun to shift overseas voting trends in a new and welcome direction."

The Secretary of Defense is responsible for implementing the federal laws that cover the registration and voting of soldiers and government workers overseas while the Federal Voting Assistance Program (FVAP) administers the process of voting.

== See also ==
- Electronic voting by country § United States
