= Federal Write-In Absentee Ballot =

The Federal Write-In Absentee Ballot (FWAB) is a write-in ballot for use by overseas American citizens. Under the Uniformed and Overseas Citizens Absentee Voting Act, the ballot was created for citizens who "have made a timely application for but have not received their regular ballot from the state or territory, subject to certain conditions." Parts of the act are administered by the Federal Voting Assistance Program.

== See also ==
- Absentee ballot
