= Black suffrage in Pennsylvania =

Prior to the early 1800s wealthy African-American men in Pennsylvania could vote just as their rich European-American male counterparts could. However, voting rights were expanded to include poor European-American men ("universal manhood suffrage"), in a shift that began the move away from a society stratified by wealth, to one which was now also based on race; black wealthy men were now no longer allowed to vote. This page covers the context of the gradual decline in rights for African Americans which culminated in the loss of their voting rights, as well as the effects on the surrounding society and the resulting political climate as well as the revolt from the black community.

== Context ==
The 19th century is a fundamental period in understanding a shift to a deeper racial consciousness away from the previous emphasis on the social class of people. During the 1830s the Pennsylvania anti-slavery movement underwent a drastic transition with a large influx of non-Quakers, coinciding with an increasing radicalization. This resulted in a subsequent ideological divide; the Quakers continued to favour petitions and non-violent means of trying to gradually attain emancipation; "immediatists", on the other hand, wanted instant unconditional freedom.

Prior to the 1838 Pennsylvania constitutional convention, the Pennsylvania constitution state that "In elections of the citizen every freeman… shall enjoy the rights of an elector." The problem, as often is with constitutions, was that there were varying interpretations of this. Most white men interpreted this as meaning that only free white men could vote. The African-American community, however, believed this entitled them the right to vote. As such they voted in previous elections, albeit it in rural areas as they feared violent backlash from angry white urban mobs.

== The 1838 Pennsylvania Constitutional Convention ==
The 1838 convention was held with its original primary goal of reforming the tax and ownership restrictions placed on suffrage in order to enable the impoverished citizens of Pennsylvania to vote. However, due to the intense political turmoil target towards Black Philadelphians, thousands of white citizens petitioned the convention to restrict suffrage to whites, and on 20 January 1838 their wish was granted as the constitution was amended to be restricted to "white freemen." John Z Ross tried to justify the convention's actions in an official statement by proposing that although "all men are free and equal" this does not apply to black citizens in a political sense, "only in a sense of nature". He argued that this was what was best for the communities’ "security and happiness" and further added that Black men should not be able to vote as he did not believe that they have any "conceptions of civil liberty".

== African-American community response ==
Naturally, African Americans wanted to try to repeal this decision. Peter A. Jay responded to Ross's proclamation by highlighting that the convention's inception was to try to "extend the right of suffrage...[not for it] to be restricted". In his speech, he emphasized that African Americans had committed no crime, to be "punished" for. They are, instead, being persecuted for the color of their skin. He also brought light to the fact that in other states such as Virginia and North Carolina, "free people of color are permitted to vote", as such it would not be such a stretch to continue to allow black men the right to vote.

== Appeal of 40,000 citizens ==
Perhaps the most well-known response from the African American population of Pennsylvania was the "Appeal of 40,000 citizens threatened with disenfranchisement to the people of Pennsylvania." The document created by Robert Purvis, outlined the numerous reasons why people of colour should have the right to vote just as much as their white counterparts. They presented this document as an appeal of the reform conventions decision on March 14, 1838. The appeal outlined that the African American community is proud to be Pennsylvanian and should be as such allowed to contribute to its democracy, notably stating "don’t starve our patriotism". It further emphasises that the coloured population of Pennsylvania, which stood at 18,768 people, contribute in the very least $1,350,000 in taxes annually. Furthermore, they stimulated the economy through home ownership and rental, water bills, and were employed in various labour jobs. "The Appeal" noted that the African American community should not be punished just so that the "white blood" won't be "Sullied by an intermixture with [theirs]" Although the actions the African American community took in response to the repeal of their right to vote were not immediately successful, they were steps that would help begin the path to political freedom for Black freemen in Pennsylvania.

== Ramifications for African-American community ==
Aside from the obvious consequence of the African American community losing their right to vote (one which they would not regain until 1870 from the 15th Amendment of the United States constitution), which came with a subsequent loss in the little political power the African-American community had previously had, there was a large shift to a larger ‘us’ versus ‘them’ mentality, leading to more extreme hatred towards the African American community. Further, this right was delayed being implemented until 1873.

In order to try achieve the common goal of racial equality, Pennsylvania Hall was built, with a primary purpose of holding anti-slavery meetings. Erected on 14 May 1838, this building's fate represents the shift to a more racially discriminatory society in that it lasted only four days before anti-black rioters burned it to the ground. And so a building designed for the purpose of "virtue, liberty and independence" by the Pennsylvania anti-slavery association, instead highlighted how prominent and dangerous the anti-black groups in Pennsylvania were. Not only did the community lose a potential platform to try attain suffrage but also their $40,000 investment in it. A further indicator of the society's race division was the mere fact that the anti-slavery association and people associated with the project were receiving threats before the building had even been built.

== See also ==
- African-American women's suffrage movement
