= National Defense Authorization Act for Fiscal Year 2010 =

United States defense funding law

The National Defense Authorization Act for Fiscal Year 2010 (H.R. 2647, Pub. L. 111–84 (text) (PDF), 123 Stat. 2190.) is a law in the United States signed by President Barack Obama on October 28, 2009. As a bill it was H.R. 2647 in the 111th Congress. The overall purpose of the law is to authorize funding for the defense of the United States and its interests abroad, for military construction, and for national security-related energy programs.

House vote on 2009–2010 Defense Appropriations Democratic aye Republican aye Abstention or no representative seated Democratic no Republican no

Senate vote on 2009–2010 Defense Appropriations Both yes One yes, one didn't vote One yes, one no One no, one didn't vote Both no

== Division A ==
3.4% basic military pay raise

=== Title I ===
- Subtitle D, Sections 132 & 133 repealed the FY 2009 F-22 Raptor fighter aircraft funding and re-directed it to preserving the maintenance and tooling of the existing program.

=== Title V ===
- Subtitle H - Military and Overseas Voter Empowerment Act

=== Title XII ===
- Subtitle B - Success in Countering Al Qaeda Reporting Requirements Act of 2009
- Subtitle D - Victims of Iranian Censorship Act (or the VOICE Act)

Authorizes the Secretary of State to continue efforts in support of Iranian dissidents

=== Title XVIII ===
- Military Commissions Act of 2009 - completely amended the existing statutes.

=== Title XIX ===
- Non-Foreign Area Retirement Equity Assurance Act of 2009

== Division B ==
- Military Construction Authorization Act for Fiscal Year 2010

== Division E ==
- Matthew Shepard and James Byrd, Jr. Hate Crimes Prevention Act

Expanded federal hate crime law to include crimes motivated by a victim's actual or perceived gender, sexual orientation, gender identity, or disability.

== See also ==
- National Defense Authorization Act
- Department of Homeland Security Appropriations Act, 2010
  - American Communities' Right to Public Information Act
  - OPEN FOIA Act of 2009
  - Protected National Security Documents Act of 2009
