= Raquel DiDomenico =

First female combat engineer senior sergeant (US Army)

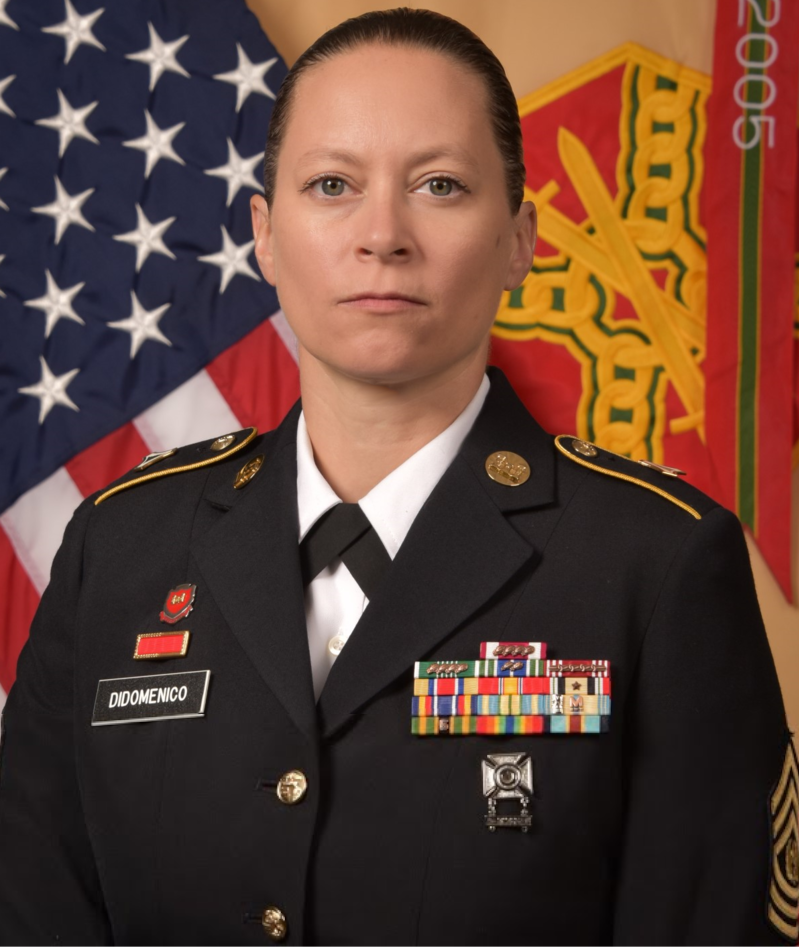
- DiDomenico in 2015
- Born: Raquel Angeline DiDomenico; November 27, 1980 (age 45); Grosse Pointe, Michigan
- Other name: Raquel Steckman
- Children: 2
- Military career
- Branch: Army
- Service years: 1998 - 2023
- Rank: command sergeant major
- Awards: Army Commendation Medal (5); Army Good Conduct Medal (4); Army Achievement Medal(3); Meritorious Service Medal (2); Bronze Order of the deFleury

Raquel DiDomenico (Steckman) was the first female combat engineer senior sergeant in the United States Army appointed to a sapper company as a first sergeant.

== Military career ==
She began her career in the US Army Reserve 652 Engineer Company (Multi-Role Bridge). From 2009 to 2010, she served in Baghdad, Iraq as an operations sergeant with the 401 Engineer Company (Multi-Role Bridge).

On Jan. 9, 2015, 1st Sgt. Raquel Steckman reported as the new first sergeant of the 374th Engineer Company in Concord, California, becoming the first female combat engineer senior sergeant 12Z qualified to hold leadership position in a Sapper unit.

Until 2018, DiDomenico served as Battle Staff Instructor and Operations Non-Commissioned Officer in Charge at the NCO Academy, Fort McCoy, Wisconsin.

In early 2018, DiDomenico was selected for promotion to E9 and assumed the role of Engineer School Reserve Component Sergeant Major at Fort Leonard Wood, and attended the non-resident Sergeants Major Academy.

During a ceremony at Fort McCoy on July 1, 2021, DiDomenico replaced Command Sgt. Maj. Paul Mantha as the garrison Command Sergeant Major. A Command Sergeant Major (CSM) is the most senior enlisted member of a color-bearing Army unit. The CSM is appointed to serve as a spokesman to address the issues of all soldiers, from enlisted to officers, from warrant officers and lieutenants to the Army's highest positions.

Her military education includes Distributed Learning Course (DLC) Level 6, Sergeants Major Course, Joint Engineer Operations Course, Foundation Training Developer, Intermediate Facilitation Skills, Foundation Instructor Facilitator, Army Training Requirements and Resource System (ATRRS) Operator, Faculty Development Program, Master Leader Course, Master Resilience Trainer, Operations Security (OPSEC) Level 2, Casualty Assistance & Notification, Structured Self Development (SSD) Level 4 (12B Senior Leader Course), 12C Basic Non-commissioned Officer Course (BNCOC), Common Core BNCOC, Primary Leadership Development Course (PLDC), Battle Staff, Company Trainer Course, Reserve Component Mobilization Planner, Hazardous Material (HAZMAT) Certifying Official, Voting Assistance Officer, Mail Manager, SINCGARS, Combat Lifesaver, Duty Appointed Retention NCO, and One Station Unit Training (OSUT) Bridge Crewmember.

On May 15, 2023, she sent an email saying simply there would be a

"Formal military retirement ceremony 31 May 2023 at 1330 in the Engineer Regimental Room on Fort Leonard Wood, Missouri...

Please do NOT feel obligated to attend any of this. It is a short ceremony; nothing flashy. I just want you to know that you are important to me and invited.

Respectfully,
RAQUEL A. DIDOMENICO
CSM, USA
Command Sergeant Major

U.S. Army Garrison
Fort McCoy, Wisconsin"

== images ==
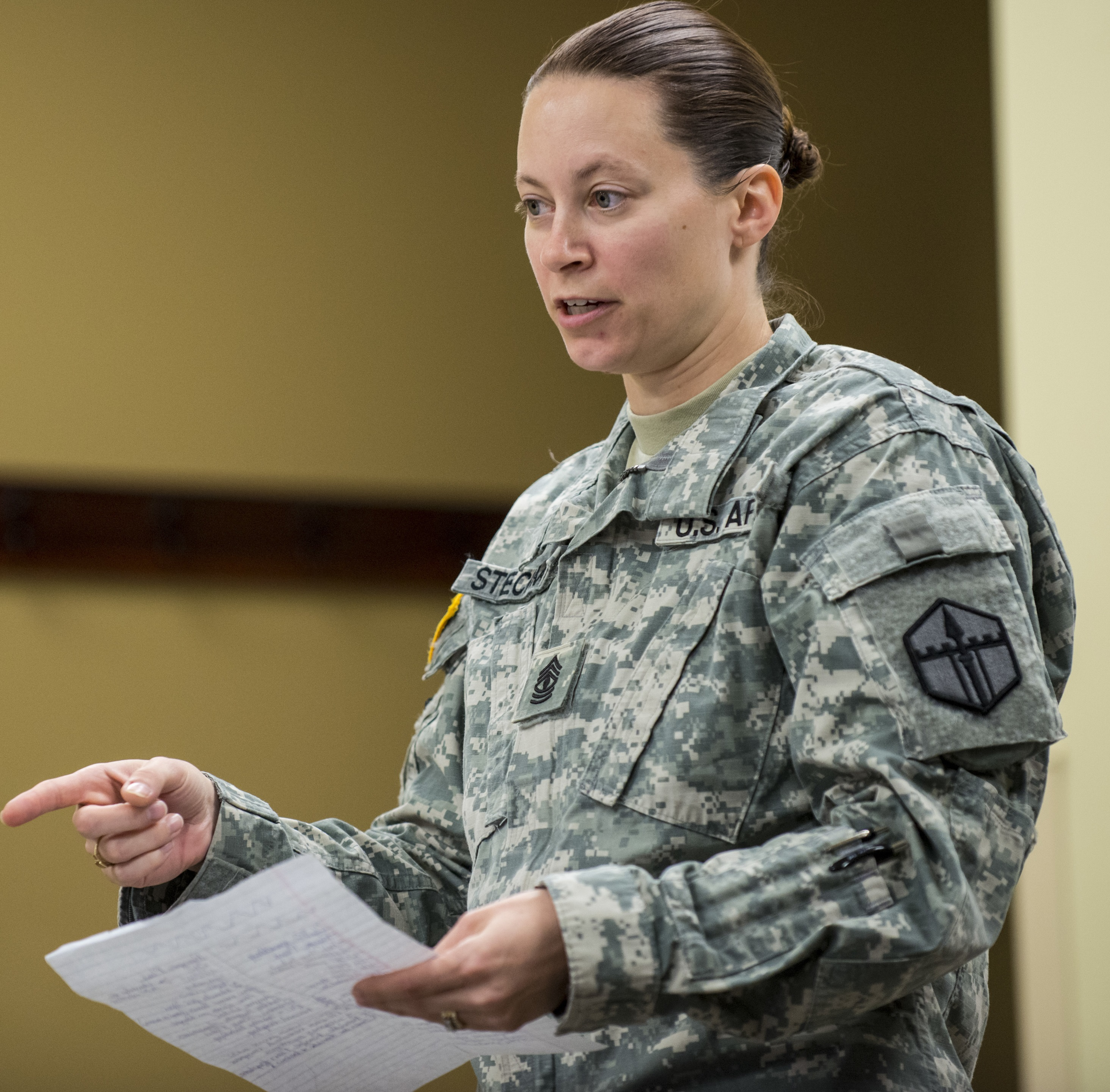

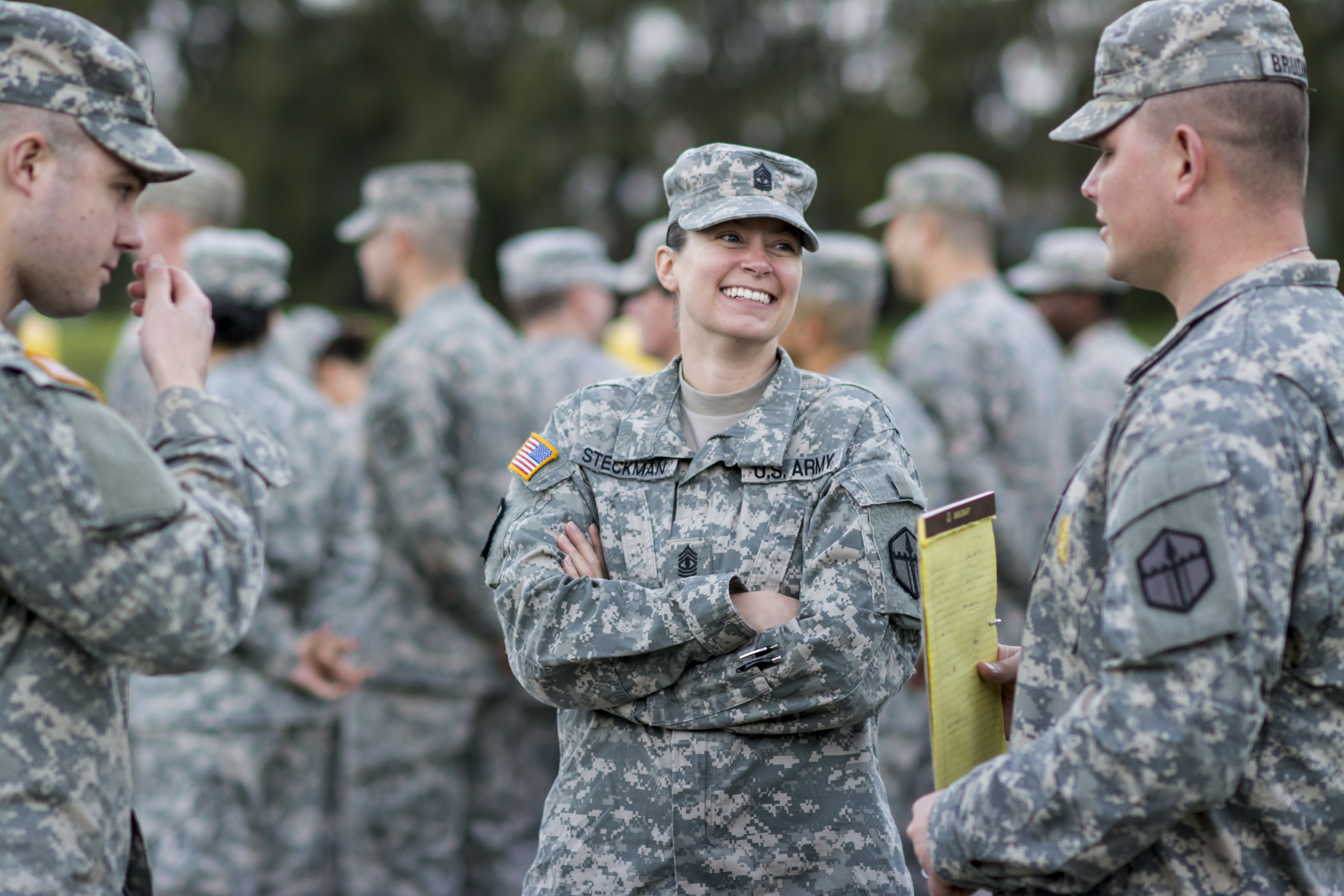

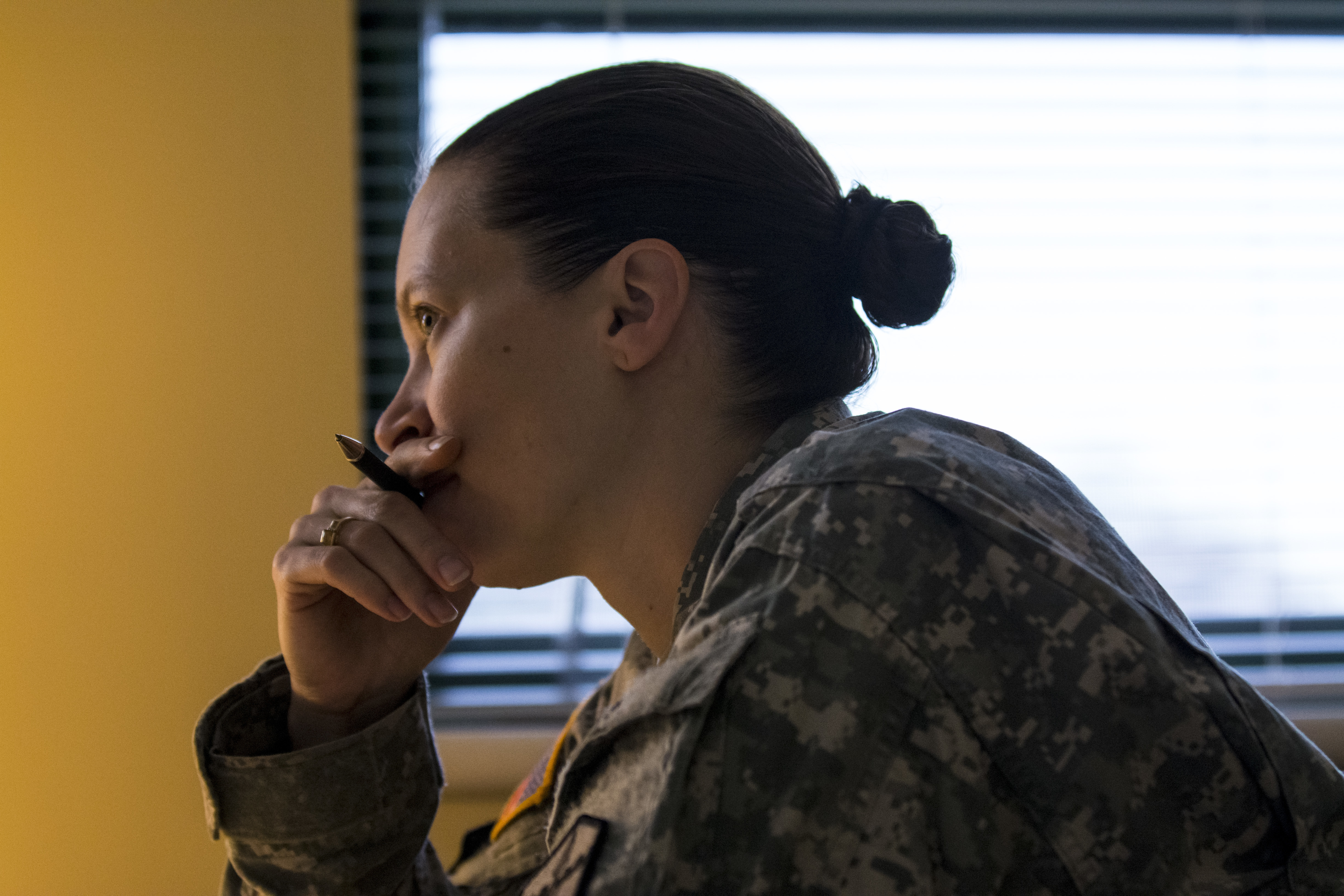

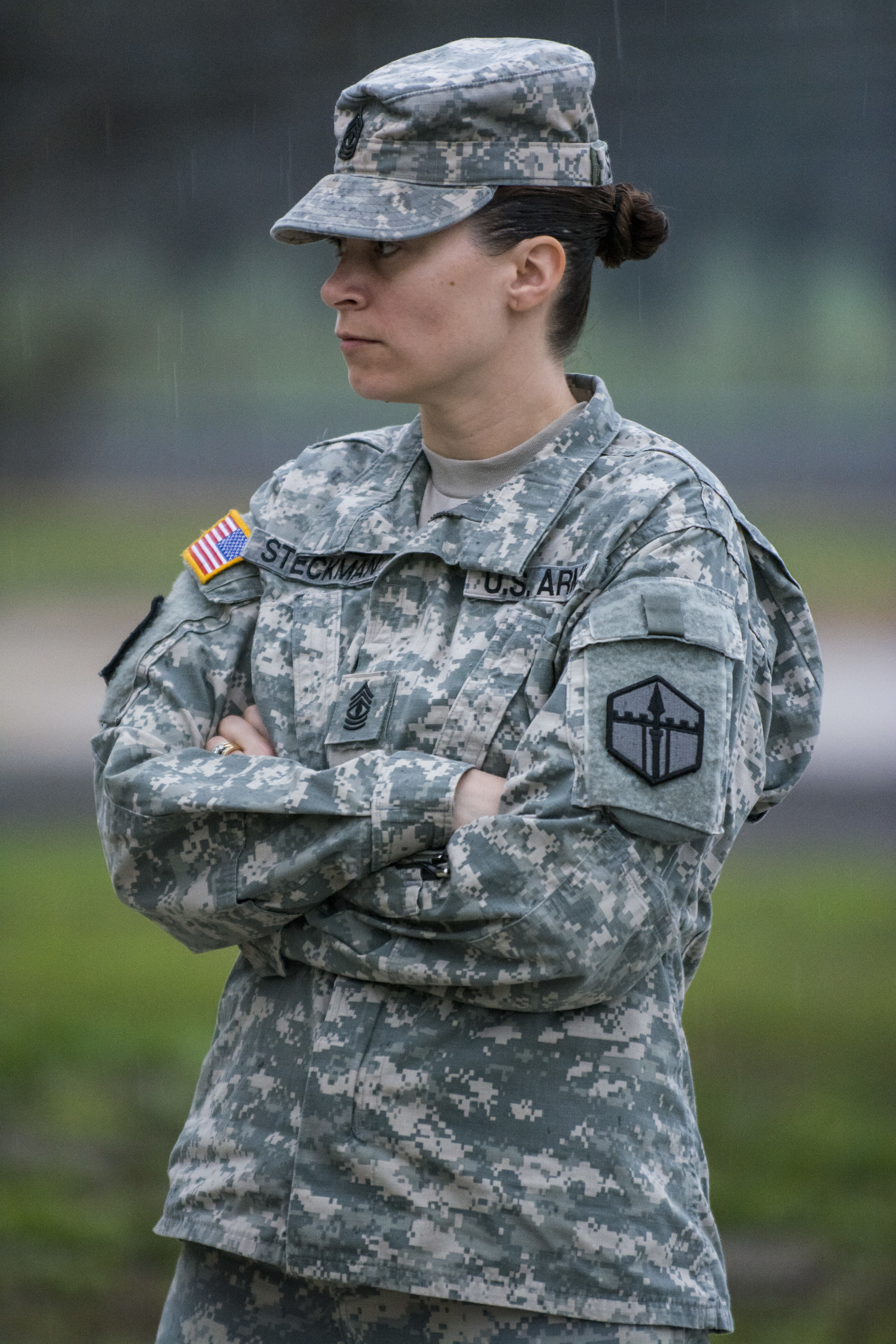

== Interviews ==
- "Behind the Triad Leadership Podcast - CSM Raquel DiDomenico", US DoD
- "Fort McCoy Garrison CSM discusses ease of using Commissary CLICK2GO online ordering", US DoD
- "Womens History Month Feature Command Sergeant Major CSM Raque DiDomenico", Faith, Health, Home

== Acting ==
- "2022 Holiday Message from the Fort McCoy Garrison Command Team - CSM Raquel DiDomenico", U.S. Army video by Greg Mason, Fort McCoy Multi-Media Visual Information
