= IVote =

U.S. voting rights organization

iVote is an American voting rights organization. The New York Times described iVote's efforts as "the first major push to counter the Republican moves with a legislative strategy to expand voter rights." In 2022, Axios called iVote "one of the biggest winners of election night."

== History ==
The group was founded in 2014 by former aides to Barack Obama and Bill Clinton. Ellen Kurz, who has been called "a one-person Paul Revere, warning of the dangers of vote-suppression efforts," is the president of iVote.

iVote led the campaign to pass automatic voter registration in Nevada, and has run additional electoral and legislative campaigns in 11 states to pass automatic voter registration.

In 2018, iVote raised over $14 million to run successful campaigns in U.S. swing states, including Michigan (Jocelyn Benson), Arizona (Katie Hobbs), Colorado (Jena Griswold), and Nevada (Automatic Voter Registration ballot initiative).

In Arizona, iVote's investment led to pro-Hobbs' efforts outspending the Republican opponent "two-to-one on television." In Michigan, iVote's "spending amounted to more than the Republican candidate, Mary Treder Lange of Gross Pointe Farms, raised for her campaign." In Nevada, iVote led the more than $10 million campaign to pass an automatic voter registration ballot initiative with 59.57% of the vote.

In 2020, iVote raised $18 million for a voter education effort in swing states that reached more than 15 million voters.

Then in 2022, iVote "invested $15 million in secretary of state races that typically fly under the radar." The organization ran ads targeting four states with Republican nominees "who didn't accept the validity of the 2020 election outcome," and all four were defeated: Kim Crockett (Minnesota), Mark Finchem (Arizona), Kristina Karamo (Michigan), and Jim Marchant (Nevada). iVote's investment in Arizona was an historic amount of money spent on a secretary of state's race.
