= Federal Voting Assistance Program =

United States voter education program

Logo

The Federal Voting Assistance Program (FVAP) is a voter assistance and education program established by the United States Department of Defense (DoD) in accordance with federal law to ensure that members of the U.S. Armed Forces, their eligible family members, and U.S. citizens overseas are aware of their right to vote and have the tools to do so from the country where they are residing.

== History ==
The Federal Voting Assistance Program (FVAP) is a component of the Office of the Under Secretary of Defense for Personnel and Readiness (P&R). FVAP administers the federal responsibilities of the Uniformed and Overseas Citizens Absentee Voting Act (UOCAVA) of 1986. FVAP was created under the Federal Voting Assistance Act of 1955 that was signed into law by President Dwight D. Eisenhower to assist military service members, civilian federal government employees, and their families to vote by absentee ballot. The act has been amended on several occasions, the most notable of which was the Military and Overseas Voter Empowerment Act (MOVE) in 2009. The act covers more than six million potential voters: active duty members of the Uniformed Services, including the Coast Guard, Public Health Service Commissioned Corps, the Merchant Marine, the National Oceanic and Atmospheric Administration (NOAA), and their voting-age dependents, as well as U.S. citizens residing outside the United States. FVAP acts on behalf of the United States Secretary of Defense, who is UOCAVA's presidential designee per Executive Order 12642.

FVAP also provides voter registration resources to Military members and their families at Installation Voting Assistance Offices and Armed Forces recruitment offices in accordance with the National Voter Registration Act of 1993 (NVRA).

== Responsibilities ==
FVAP is tasked with:

- Providing military and overseas voters covered under UOCAVA with nonpartisan information about voter registration and assistance with the absentee voting process.
- Producing and distributing voting resources to election officials, Voting Assistance Officers, and voters in order to help them navigate the absentee voting process.
- Informing states of their requirements under UOCAVA and the particular challenges military and overseas voters face in the absentee voting process.

== Voter education ==
FVAP creates and disseminates educational materials to inform voters, election officials, and other stakeholders about topics such as the absentee voting process, election dates and deadlines, and contact information for stateside election offices.

FVAP also provides access to and instructions on how to complete federal forms to register and request an absentee ballot, and vote using an alternative back-up ballot.

- Federal Post Card Application
- Federal Write-In Absentee Ballot
- National Mail Voter Registration Form
- Voting Calendar

FVAP provides information to the following voters and officials on how to register and vote in federal elections as well as education on state-specific laws.

=== Military voters and their families ===
Service members located outside their voting jurisdiction (either within or outside the United States) are able to vote absentee. Military spouses and eligible family members who live outside their voting jurisdiction can also vote absentee in all federal elections under the protections of federal law.

=== Overseas citizen voters ===
U.S. citizens living abroad are able to vote absentee. FVAP provides information on how to register and request absentee ballots and the recommended mailing dates and state deadlines that can help overseas citizens overcome the obstacles of voting from another country.

=== Voting Assistance Officer ===
Voting Assistance Officers (VAO) ensure that military and overseas voters understand their voting rights and how to register and vote absentee. They provide accurate, nonpartisan voting information and assistance. FVAP provides training and resources to help VAOs carry out their responsibilities, which are typically a collateral duty relative to their primary duty assignments.

=== Election officials ===
Election officials run elections in the United States. They process the registration and absentee ballot requests submitted by Service members, their eligible family members, and overseas citizens. They also send the appropriate ballot to the voter in accordance with federal requirements. FVAP provides resources to help educate officials on the UOCAVA voting process and connect them with UOCAVA voters.

== Reports, surveys, and initiatives ==
FVAP provides analysis, information, and resources for absentee voters, VAOs, and election officials as well as reports to Congress, supporting survey data, and general research reports of interest. Survey efforts and reports include:

- Post-Election Report to Congress (2010, 2012, 2014)
- Post-Election Voting Surveys:
  - Post-Election Voting Survey of Active Duty Military (2008, 2010, 2012, 2014)
  - Post-Election Voting Survey of Department of State Voting Assistance Officers (2008, 2010, 2012, 2014)
  - Post-Election Voting Survey of Unit Voting Assistance Officers (2008, 2010, 2012, 2014)
  - Post-Election Voting Survey of Local Election Officials (2010, 2012, 2014)
- FVAP research notes:
  - The Effects of Spouses on Voting in the Active Duty Military Population
  - Registration and Voting Participation Differences Between the Active Duty Military and Citizen Voting Age Population
  - Registration and Voting Participation Differences Between the Active Duty Military and Citizen Voting Age Populations in the 2014 Election
  - Assessing the Impact of FVAP Resources

== 2008 election ==
The Heritage Foundation published an article on July 28, 2009, titled: America's Military Voters: Re-enfranchising the Disenfranchised. The article details election data that indicates the disenfranchisement of members of America's armed forces.

Deployed members of the military have to balance their normal duties with the added difficulty of sending and receiving mail from a forward position. With wait times nearing a month in duration and uncertain access to facilities, the logistical difficulties in mailing a voter registration card alone can tax even the most seasoned of veterans. In a recent Overseas Vote Foundation survey, they discovered that in the 2008 election alone, 22 percent of absentee voters, both military and overseas civilians, failed to receive their absentee ballot.

As a result, in the inherent difficulties in voting, the average military voter is far more likely to have his ballot rejected than the average voter, either as a result of improper procedure or late arrival. In the 2008 election, 106,000 of the 325,000 absentee ballots distributed to members of the military were never returned.

== Legislative initiatives ==
One of the main avenues that FVAP uses to work with states and territories is through legislative initiatives. Each year, FVAP formulates and sends recommended legislative initiatives to states and territories urging them to adopt those changes. As required by the National Defense Authorization Act for Fiscal Year 2002 (NDAA FY02), FVAP received reports from state governors and territory officials in 2003, 2004, and 2005 on the status of FVAP-recommended legislative initiatives. FVAP reviews and forwards these reports to state and territory Congressional delegations and compiles data on the legislative accomplishments. State and territory legislative changes have also occurred as a result of the Department of Justice's enforcement authority of UOCAVA.

NDAA FY02 and the Help America Vote Act of 2002 (HAVA) made two of FVAP's legislative initiatives mandatory in all states and territories: (1) the acceptance of FPCA as a request for ballots for all elections in a calendar year, and (2) the removal of the "not earlier than" restrictions for registration requests. Thus, these have been retired from the FVAP list of recommended legislative initiatives.

Significant progress has been made in referencing UOCAVA in state and territory statutes, granting emergency authority to state and territory chief election officials and enfranchising U.S. citizens who have never lived in the United States. Almost every state and territory now allows electronic transmission of election materials.

The specific initiatives that FVAP requests states and territories to pass are summarized below. In addition to these initiatives, many states and territories have passed other legislation to benefit UOCAVA citizens to include signing and dating in lieu of the postmarking requirement; late counting; moving primary or runoff election dates to allow for more ballot transit time between elections; and participation in DoD and state cooperative electronic voting projects.

1. Provide 40 to 45 Days Transit Time For Absentee Ballots to UOCAVA Voters

The most significant barrier to successful absentee voting is the late receipt of blank ballots, which leaves citizens without sufficient time to vote and return absentee ballots by mail. Uniformed Service members, their families, and overseas citizens are challenged in exercising their right to vote. The Military Postal Service Agency urges military voters in Iraq and Afghanistan to send ballots back at least 28 days before an election, and voters at other overseas military installations to send ballots back at least 21 days before an election. FVAP further recommends that citizens residing overseas return their ballots at least 28 days before an election or earlier, depending on foreign mail service. Ballots, therefore, must be sent 45 days before an election if sent through international mail and overseas military post offices in order to provide adequate time for voters to receive, vote, and return ballots, with any likelihood that their votes will be successfully received by election officials. Accepting and counting absentee ballots that were cast up to Election Day but were not received until after the election would further enfranchise these voters, and FVAP's scoring provides additional points to states that provide such post-Election Day ballot return deadlines.

2. Email and Online Transmission of Voting Materials

Email and online capabilities are widely available to and have become the communications standard for Uniformed Service members and overseas citizens, essentially replacing fax and mail. Transmission of voting materials by email or online has improved the opportunity to vote for UOCAVA citizens by providing high-speed delivery of election materials to and from voters and local election officials. Fax capabilities, on the other hand, are generally unavailable to military voters and overseas citizens. It is necessary that email and online transmission options are available to all Uniformed Service members, their families, and overseas citizens and that email and online transmission become the principal methods of sending election materials to these citizens. It is also crucial that the states expand the use of email and online transmission for all elections materials, including registration forms, ballot requests and absentee ballots. Furthermore, voting materials transmitted by electronic means should not require subsequent submission by mail.

Although this scoring system does not give points for providing electronic absentee balloting systems, it does provide points for allowing, at the voter's discretion, the return of static copies of voted ballots by electronic means, such as a scanned copy of a voted ballot emailed back to an election official. Although necessarily forcing the voter to relinquish the right to a private ballot, many Uniformed Services and overseas voters would prefer to give up that right and have their ballots counted rather than to not have their ballot counted at all. FVAP believes that that option must be preserved for these voters.

Online transmission provides a line of communication between local election officials and UOCAVA voters, as it allows them to provide updates on the successful delivery of voting materials and voter registration information. Finally, for mobile UOCAVA voters, particularly Uniformed Services voters, email addresses are potentially more consistent than postal addresses.

3. Expanded Use of Federal Write-In Absentee Ballot

UOCAVA citizens should be authorized to use the Federal Write-In Absentee Ballot (FWAB) to vote in general, primary, special, and runoff elections for federal, state, and local offices. When insufficient time exists between the scheduling of a special or runoff election and the set election date, citizens may not receive their state ballots in time to vote. Expanding the use of the FWAB for all elections provides UOCAVA citizens a greater opportunity to vote in these elections.

Additionally, the FWAB should be accepted simultaneously as a voter registration application, absentee ballot request, and absentee ballot. This provision will allow this highly mobile population to participate in elections far in advance of a deployment, reassignment, or move. FVAP has recommended a new policy that the FWAB be the only write-in ballot used for Uniformed Services and overseas voters; the authorization and use of both a FWAB and a State Write-In Absentee Ballot introduces greater complexity and opportunity for error for Uniformed Services and overseas voters. Using the single FWAB will allow future technological solutions by FVAP to incorporate state and local races into online FWAB solutions, further extending this franchise opportunity.

4. Participation with Uniform Law Commission Effort and Adoption of Recommendations

The Uniform Law Commission (ULC) is drafting the Military Services and Overseas Civilian Absentee Voting Act to be presented for future adoption by the states. FVAP supports the efforts of the Commissioners in this endeavor and recommends that states participate in and support the drafting of the act through their state representatives on the Commission. The sheer diversity of individual election laws regarding Uniformed Services and overseas voters is a serious hindrance to these voters successfully exercising their franchise. Uniformity and standardization of voting laws for the Uniformed Services and overseas voters would substantially ease the burden of compliance and improve voter success. Furthermore, FVAP recommends that the state chief election official work closely with the state legislative body to enact the act when it is presented to the states for adoption.

5. Emergency Authority for State Chief Election Official

During a period of a declared emergency or other situation in which a short time frame for ballot transmission exists, the governor or designated state official should have the authority to designate alternate methods for handling absentee ballots to ensure UOCAVA voters have the opportunity to exercise their right to vote.

6. Removal of Notarization and Witnessing Requirements

Notarization and witnessing requirements on voter registration applications, ballot requests, and voted ballots present a real barrier to voting for many UOCAVA citizens. Citizens living in remote areas overseas are hindered because notary services may not exist or may be prohibitively expensive and difficult to access. Similarly, witnessing requirements, especially those that specify the age or citizenship of the witness, may disenfranchise voters who cannot satisfy this requirement due to their location or circumstances. Notarization or witnessing requirements for all absentee balloting materials should be removed, and the voter's signature and date, under the self-administered oath on these voting materials, should verify the legitimacy of the voter and the application or ballot.

7. Late Registration Procedures

Recently discharged Uniformed Service members and their accompanying families or overseas citizens returning to the United States may become residents of a state just before an election, but not in time to register by the state's deadline and vote. The adoption of special procedures for late registration would allow these citizens to register and vote in the upcoming election.

8. Enfranchise Citizens Who Have Never Resided in the U.S.

Many U.S. citizens who have never resided in a state or territory are not entitled to vote under current state law. These citizens are voting age children of U.S. citizens eligible to vote under UOCAVA themselves. Absent the decisions made by these children's parents to reside overseas, these disenfranchised children of UOCAVA voters would likely otherwise be allowed to vote. Therefore, FVAP urges that these U.S. citizens be allowed to vote in elections for federal offices in the state in which either parent is eligible to vote under UOCAVA.
