= Uniformed and Overseas Citizens Absentee Voting Act =

US law on elections and voting rights

- Long title: An Act to consolidate and improve provisions of law relating to absentee registration and voting in elections for Federal office by members of uniformed services and persons who reside overseas.
- Nicknames: Uniformed and Overseas Citizens Absentee Voting Act of 1986
- Enacted by: the 99th United States Congress
- Effective: August 28, 1986

Citations
- Public law: 99-410
- Statutes at Large: 100 Stat. 924

Codification
- Titles amended: 42 U.S.C.: Public Health and Social Welfare transferred to 52 U.S.C.: Voting and Elections
- U.S.C. sections created: 42 U.S.C. ch. 20, subch. I-G § 1973ff et seq. transferred to 52 U.S.C. §§ 20301–20311

Legislative history
- Introduced in the House as H.R. 4393 by Al Swift (D–WA) on March 12, 1986; Committee consideration by House Administration; Passed the House on August 12, 1986 (Passed Voice Vote); Passed the Senate on August 16, 1986 (Passed Voice Vote); Signed into law by President Ronald Reagan on August 28, 1986

The Uniformed and Overseas Citizens Absentee Voting Act (UOCAVA), P.L. 99-410, 52 U.S.C. §§ 20301–20311, 39 U.S.C. § 3406, 18 U.S.C. §§ 608–609, is a United States federal law dealing with elections and voting rights for United States citizens residing overseas. The act requires that all U.S. states, the District of Columbia, Puerto Rico, Guam, American Samoa, and the U.S. Virgin Islands allow certain U.S. citizens to register to vote and to vote by absentee ballot in federal elections. The act is Public Law 99-410 and was signed into law by President Ronald Reagan on August 28, 1986.

Groups of people covered under the act are:

- Members of the then-seven (now eight) Uniformed Services
- Members of the U.S. Merchant Marine
- Eligible family members of the above
- U.S. citizens employed by the federal government residing outside the U.S.
- Other private U.S. citizens residing outside the United States

The act provides for an emergency back-up ballot, the Federal Write-In Absentee Ballot (FWAB), which can be cast by voters who "have made a timely application for but have not received their regular ballot from the state or territory, subject to certain conditions." Postage is free for UOCAVA registrations and ballots, including FWAB.

The act does not apply to non-federal elections, although most states also let citizens covered by the UOCAVA register and vote in state and local elections. Before 1986 there had been some access to voting from abroad, but it varied.

== FVAP ==
The Federal Voting Assistance Program (FVAP), part of the Department of Defense, is the program that administers the UOCAVA as well as the National Voter Registration Act of 1993 on behalf of the Secretary of Defense. The FVAP states its goals as to "inform and educate U.S. citizens worldwide of their right to vote; facilitate voting participation; and protect the integrity of, and simultaneously enhance, the electoral process at the Federal, State and local levels."

== Voting methods ==
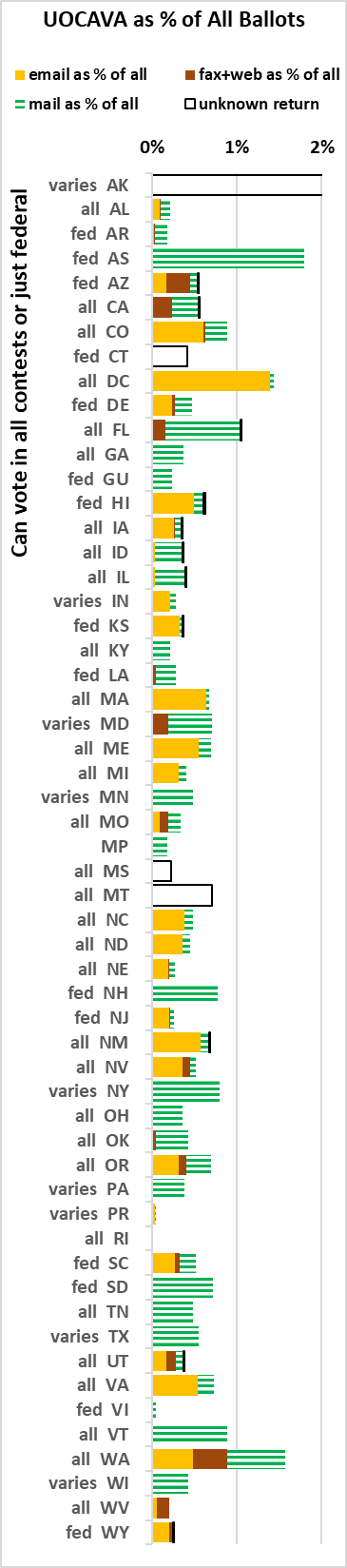
UOCAVA as percent of all votes, 2020 general election

UOCAVA lets uniformed service members request absentee ballots as early as they wish in an election year. Any time after that request they may send the Federal Write-In Absentee Ballot from outside the US, so they can vote even if they are on extended missions without communication, if they can send it from outside the US.

UOCAVA lets covered groups get ballots electronically (email, fax, or web site) from all states. Some states transmit ballots electronically to other groups.

Twenty states require ballots to be returned by mail.

Four states allow ballot submission through secure web sites: AZ, CO (if needed), MO, and WV. In 2019-2020 researchers found insecurities in online voting systems used for UOCAVA from Voatz and Democracy Live.

The four states allowing online voting and the remaining 27 states have a mix of rules allowing email or fax to return ballots: AK, CA, DE, DC, FL, HI, IN, IA, KS, LA, ME, MA, MS, MT, NE, NV, NJ, NM, NC, MD, OK, OR, RI, SC, TX (for danger, combat zones or space), UT, and WA.

Maine and Rhode Island tabulate all votes cast in elections based on rules set out by UOCAVA in a single total at the bottom of the states official election result reports (such reports are officially posted in a csv file structure document) instead of separately tabulating such votes in the same category as all other votes cast in their home towns.

== Executive Order 12642 ==
An executive order issued by President Reagan on June 9, 1988, designated the Secretary of Defense as the presidential designee responsible for administering the act and authorizes the Secretary of Defense to delegate the responsibilities under the act and executive order to any person or persons within the Department of Defense. Department of Defense directives issued by Secretaries of Defense have delegated responsibilities for the FVAP to a FVAP director. The current director as of November 2020 is David Bierne.

The act was amended by the Help America Vote Act (2002) and the National Defense Authorization Acts in 2002 and 2005.

== Relevance to District of Columbia voting rights ==
The Uniformed and Overseas Citizens Absentee Voting Act allows U.S. citizens to vote from overseas, even if they have permanently left the United States. Since these citizens are no longer residents of a U.S. state but maintain their right to vote, legal scholars have therefore argued that United States Congress also has the authority to grant voting rights to residents of the District of Columbia.

== Relevance to Puerto Rico voting rights ==
The Uniformed and Overseas Citizens Absentee Voting Act has also been challenged in federal court by U.S. citizens living in Puerto Rico. Plaintiffs in the case of Igartua de la Rosa v. United States claimed that the Act is unconstitutional because it allows U.S. citizens who move abroad to vote in federal elections, but not if they relocate to Puerto Rico. The challenge was dismissed by the courts. However, in his dissent, Judge Juan R. Torruella argued that the United States Constitution neither denies citizens of Puerto Rico the right to vote for members of the United States House of Representatives nor imposes a limitation on the federal government's authority to extend federal voting rights to territorial residents under other constitutional powers.

== See also ==
- Voting rights in the United States
- District of Columbia voting rights
- Federal voting rights in Puerto Rico
