= 2002 United States House of Representatives elections in New Jersey =

- November 5, 2002

All 13 New Jersey seats to the United States House of Representatives
- Turnout: 46% (▼24pp)
| | Majority party | Minority party |
|---|---|---|
| Party | Democratic | Republican |
| Last election | 7 | 6 |
| Seats won | 7 | 6 |
| Seat change | Steady | Steady |
| Popular vote | 1,030,204 | 933,964 |
| Percentage | 51.35% | 46.55% |
| Swing | ▲0.05 | ▲0.25 |

Democratic hold
Republican hold
Democratic
50–60%
60–70%
70–80%
80–90%
90–100%
Republican
50–60%
60–70%
70–80%

The 2002 United States House of Representatives elections in New Jersey were held on November 5, 2002, to determine who would represent the people of New Jersey in the United States House of Representatives. This election coincided with national elections for the U.S. House and U.S. Senate. New Jersey has thirteen seats in the House, apportioned according to the 2000 United States census. Representatives are elected for two-year terms.

== Overview ==
United States House of Representatives elections in New Jersey, 2002
| Party | Votes | Percentage | Seats | +/– |
|---|---|---|---|---|
| Democratic | 1,030,204 | 51.35% | 7 | Steady |
| Republican | 933,964 | 46.55% | 6 | Steady |
| Libertarian | 11,062 | 0.55% | 0 | Steady |
| Green | 10,024 | 0.49% | 0 | Steady |
| Independents | 20,805 | 1.03% | 0 | Steady |
| Totals | 2,006,059 | 100.00% | 13 | — |

== Background ==
Following the 2000 United States census, the New Jersey legislature conducted decennial redistricting.

== District 1 ==
2002 New Jersey's 1st congressional district election
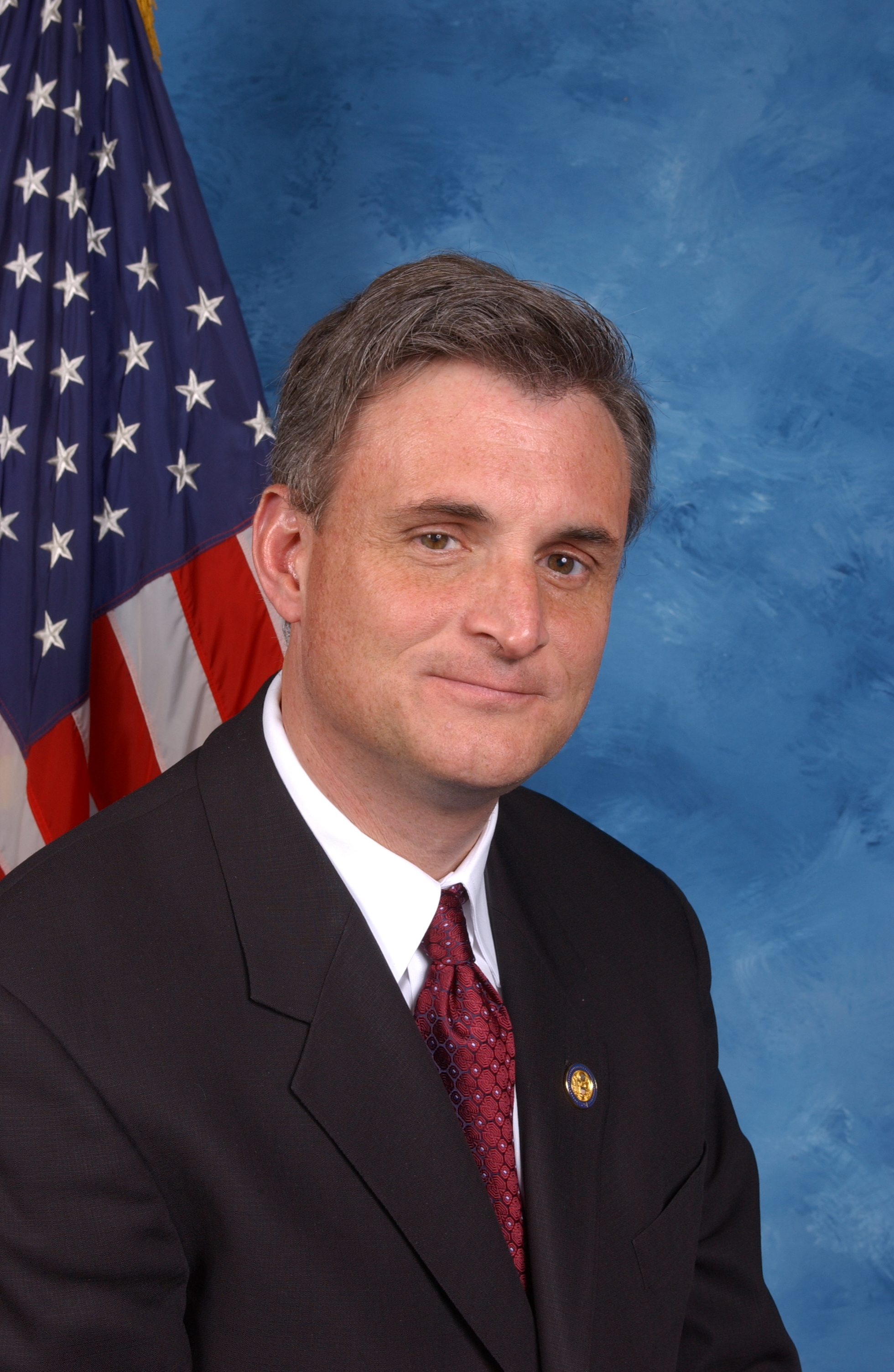

| Nominee | Rob Andrews | Timothy Haas |
| Party | Democratic | Independent |
| Popular vote | 121,846 | 9,543 |
| Percentage | 92.7% | 7.3% |
- County results *: 90–100%
U.S. Representative before election
Rob Andrews
Democratic
Elected U.S. Representative
incumbent
Democratic

Incumbent Democrat Rob Andrews won. This district covered Camden County.

=== Democratic primary ===
==== Candidates ====
- Rob Andrews, incumbent Representative from Haddon Heights since 1990

==== Results ====
2002 Democratic primary
| Party | Candidate | Votes | % |
|---|---|---|---|
| Democratic | Rob Andrews (incumbent) | 18,362 | 100.00% |
| Turnout | | 18,362 | |

=== General election ===
==== Candidates ====
- Rob Andrews, incumbent Representative from Haddon Heights since 1990 (Democratic)
- Timothy Haas (Independent)

==== Predictions ====
| Source | Ranking | As of |
|---|---|---|
| Sabato's Crystal Ball | Safe D | November 4, 2002 |
| New York Times | Safe D | October 14, 2002 |

==== Results ====
New Jersey's 1st congressional district election, 2002
| Party | Candidate | Votes | % |
|---|---|---|---|
| Democratic | Rob Andrews (incumbent) | 121,846 | 92.74% |
| Independent | Timothy Haas | 9,543 | 7.26% |
| Turnout | | 131,389 | |
| Democratic hold | | | |

== District 2 ==
2002 New Jersey's 2nd congressional district election
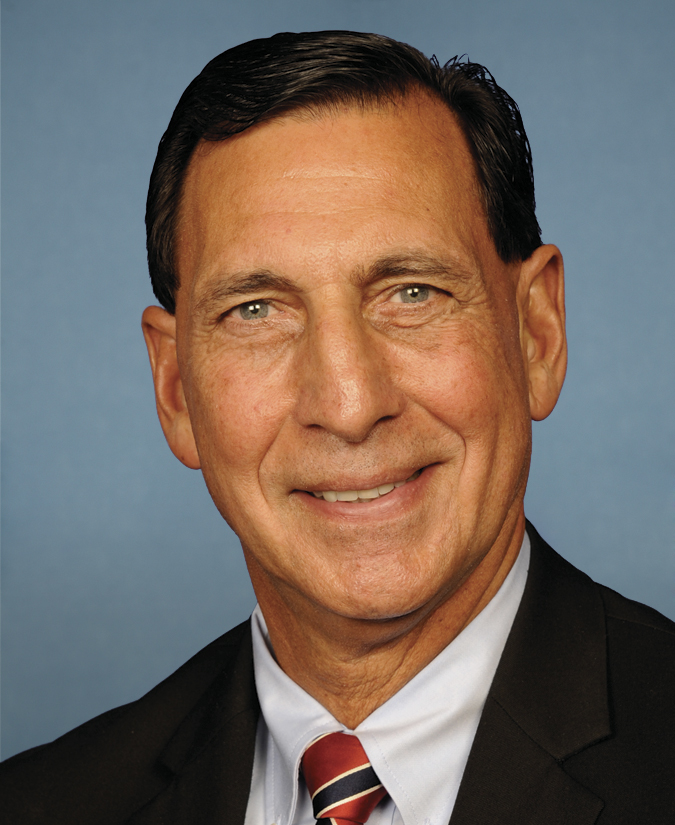

| Nominee | Frank LoBiondo | Steven A. Farkas |
| Party | Republican | Democratic |
| Popular vote | 116,834 | 47,735 |
| Percentage | 69.2% | 28.3% |
- County results *: 50–60% 60–70% 70–80%
U.S. Representative before election
Frank A. LoBiondo
Republican
Elected U.S. Representative
incumbent
Republican

Incumbent Republican Frank A. LoBiondo won. This district covers the southern part of the state.

=== Republican primary ===
==== Candidates ====
- Frank LoBiondo, incumbent Representative from Millville since 1995

==== Results ====
2002 Republican primary
| Party | Candidate | Votes | % |
|---|---|---|---|
| Republican | Frank LoBiondo (incumbent) | 25,335 | 100.00% |
| Turnout | | 25,335 | |

=== Democratic primary ===
==== Candidates ====
- Steven A. Farkas

==== Results ====
2002 Democratic primary
| Party | Candidate | Votes | % |
|---|---|---|---|
| Democratic | Steven A. Farkas | 9,182 | 100.00% |
| Turnout | | 9,182 | |

=== General election ===
==== Candidates ====
- Steven A. Farkas (Democratic)
- Frank LoBiondo, incumbent Representative from Millville since 1995 (Republican)
- Michael Matthews Jr. (Libertarian)
- Roger Merle (Green)
- Constantino Rozzo (Socialist)

==== Predictions ====
| Source | Ranking | As of |
|---|---|---|
| Sabato's Crystal Ball | Safe R | November 4, 2002 |
| New York Times | Safe R | October 14, 2002 |

==== Results ====
New Jersey's 2nd congressional district election, 2002
| Party | Candidate | Votes | % |
|---|---|---|---|
| Republican | Frank LoBiondo (incumbent) | 116,834 | 69.21% |
| Democratic | Steven A. Farkas | 47,735 | 28.28% |
| Green | Roger Merle | 1,739 | 1.03% |
| Libertarian | Michael Matthews Jr. | 1,720 | 1.02% |
| Socialist | Constantino Rozzo | 771 | 0.46% |
| Turnout | | 168,799 | |
| Republican hold | | | |

== District 3 ==
2002 New Jersey's 3rd congressional district election
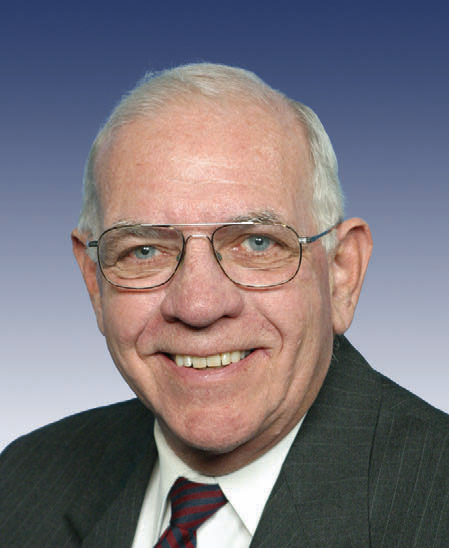

| Nominee | Jim Saxton | Richard Strada |
| Party | Republican | Democratic |
| Popular vote | 123,375 | 64,364 |
| Percentage | 65.0% | 33.9% |
- County results *: 50–60% 60–70%
U.S. Representative before election
Jim Saxton
Republican
Elected U.S. Representative
incumbent
Republican

Incumbent Republican Jim Saxton won. The district covers Burlington and Ocean counties.

=== Republican primary ===
==== Candidates ====
- Jim Saxton, incumbent Representative from Mount Holly since 1984

==== Results ====
2002 Republican primary
| Party | Candidate | Votes | % |
|---|---|---|---|
| Republican | Jim Saxton (incumbent) | 24,884 | 100.00% |
| Turnout | | 24,884 | |

=== Democratic primary ===
==== Candidates ====
- Richard Strada

==== Results ====
2002 Democratic primary
| Party | Candidate | Votes | % |
|---|---|---|---|
| Democratic | Richard Strada | 10,431 | 100.00% |
| Turnout | | 10,431 | |

=== General election ===
==== Candidates ====
- Raymond Byrne (Libertarian)
- Ken Feduniewicz (Independent)
- Jim Saxton, incumbent Representative from Mount Holly since 1984 (Republican)
- Richard Strada (Democratic)

==== Predictions ====
| Source | Ranking | As of |
|---|---|---|
| Sabato's Crystal Ball | Safe R | November 4, 2002 |
| New York Times | Safe R | October 14, 2002 |

==== Results ====
New Jersey's 3rd congressional district election, 2002
| Party | Candidate | Votes | % |
|---|---|---|---|
| Republican | Jim Saxton (incumbent) | 123,375 | 65.02% |
| Democratic | Richard Strada | 64,364 | 33.92% |
| Libertarian | Raymond Byrne | 1,335 | 0.70% |
| Independent | Ken Feduniewicz | 665 | 0.35% |
| Turnout | | 189,739 | |
| Republican hold | | | |

== District 4 ==
2002 New Jersey's 4th congressional district election
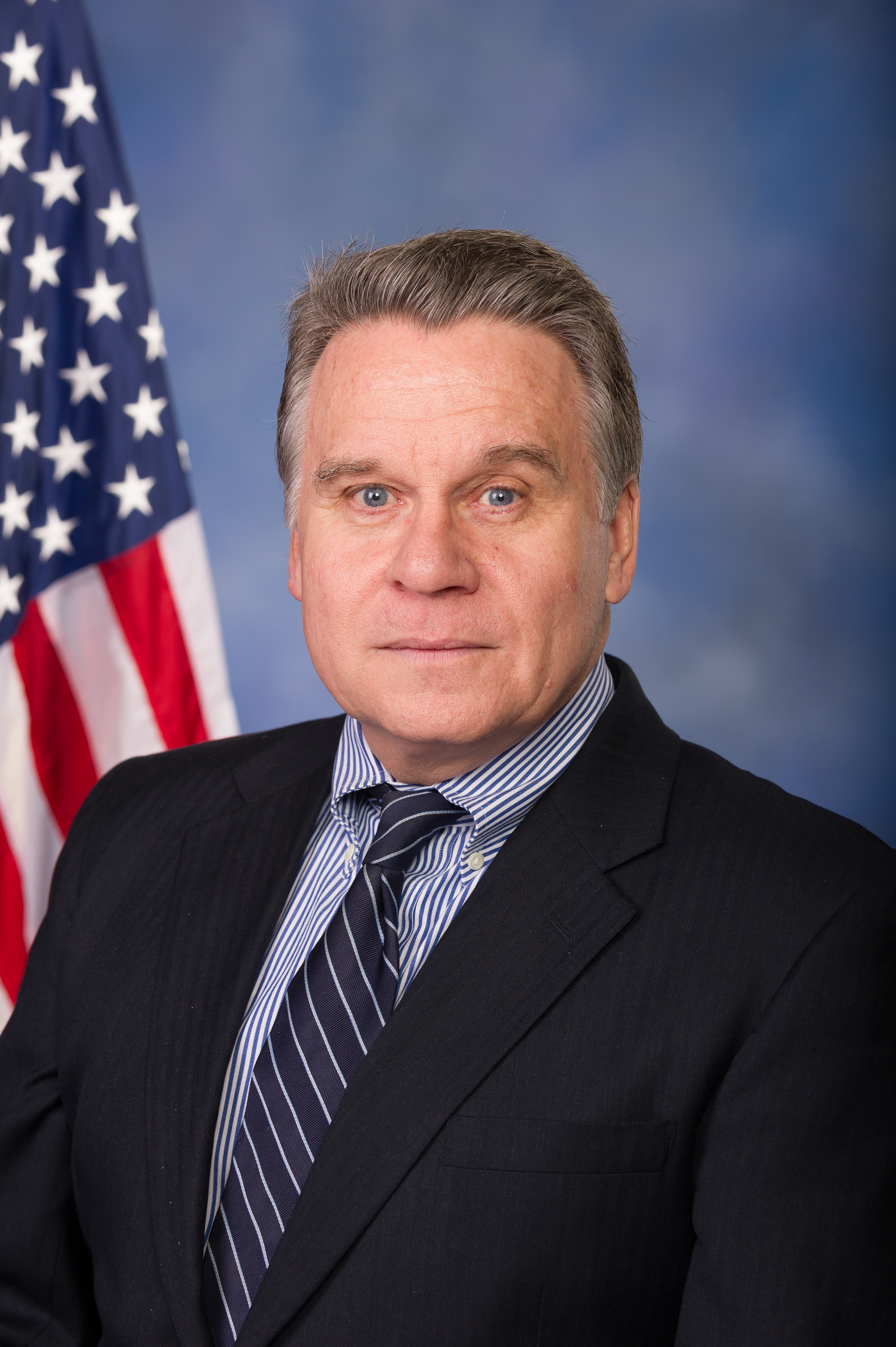

| Nominee | Chris Smith | Mary Brennan |
| Party | Republican | Democratic |
| Popular vote | 115,293 | 55,967 |
| Percentage | 66.2% | 32.1% |
- County results *: 60–70%
U.S. Representative before election
Chris Smith
Republican
Elected U.S. Representative
incumbent
Republican

Incumbent Republican Chris Smith won. This district covers 4 counties in the central part of the state.

=== Republican primary ===
==== Candidates ====
- Chris Smith, incumbent Representative from Robbinsville since 1981

==== Results ====
2002 Republican primary
| Party | Candidate | Votes | % |
|---|---|---|---|
| Republican | Chris Smith (incumbent) | 19,667 | 100.00% |
| Turnout | | 19,667 | |

=== Democratic primary ===
==== Candidates ====
- Mary Brennan

==== Results ====
2002 Democratic primary
| Party | Candidate | Votes | % |
|---|---|---|---|
| Democratic | Mary Brennan | 8,589 | 100.00% |
| Turnout | | 8,589 | |

=== General election ===
==== Candidates ====
- Mary Brennan (Democratic)
- Don Graham (Independent)
- Keith Quarles (Libertarian)
- Chris Smith, incumbent Representative from Robbinsville since 1981 (Republican)
- Hermann Winkelmann (Independent)

==== Predictions ====
| Source | Ranking | As of |
|---|---|---|
| Sabato's Crystal Ball | Safe R | November 4, 2002 |
| New York Times | Safe R | October 14, 2002 |

==== Results ====
New Jersey's 4th congressional district election, 2002
| Party | Candidate | Votes | % |
|---|---|---|---|
| Republican | Chris Smith (incumbent) | 115,293 | 66.15% |
| Democratic | Mary Brennan | 55,967 | 32.11% |
| Libertarian | Keith Quarles | 1,211 | 0.71% |
| Independent | Hermann Winkelmann | 1,063 | 0.61% |
| Independent | Don Graham | 767 | 0.44% |
| Turnout | | 174,301 | |
| Republican hold | | | |

== District 5 ==
2002 New Jersey's 5th congressional district election
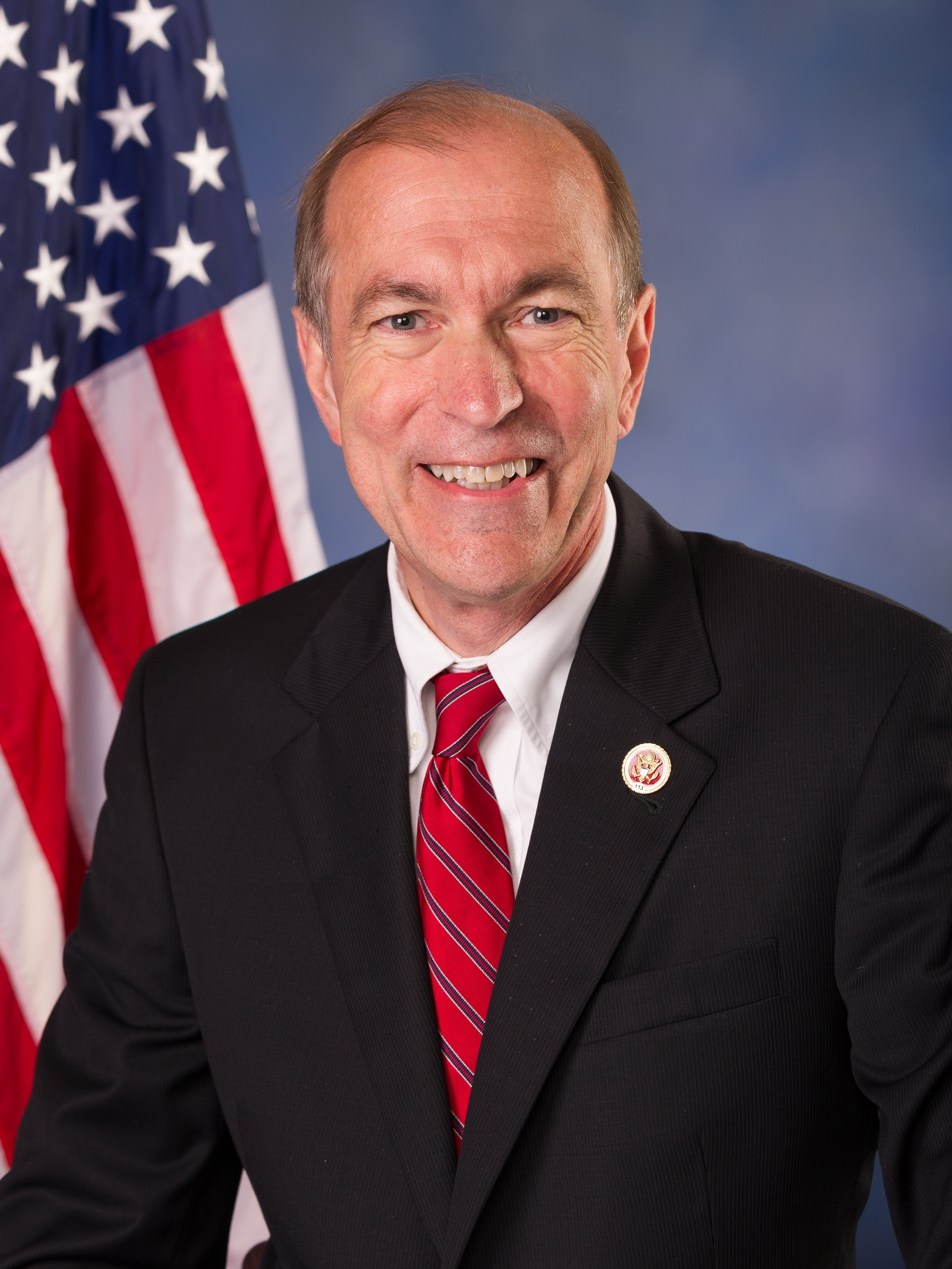

| Nominee | Scott Garrett | Anne Sumers |
| Party | Republican | Democratic |
| Popular vote | 118,881 | 76,504 |
| Percentage | 59.5% | 38.3% |
- County results Garrett: 50–60% 60–70% 70–80%
U.S. Representative before election
Marge Roukema
Republican
Elected U.S. Representative
Scott Garrett
Republican

Republican Scott Garrett held the open seat. This district covers the northern border of the state.

=== Republican primary ===
==== Candidates ====
- Akram Yosari Abdelrahman
- Gerald Cardinale, State Senator from Demarest
- Brian Fox
- Scott Garrett, Assemblyman from Wantage and candidate for this seat in 1998 and 2000
- David C. Russo, Assemblyman from Ridgewood

===== Declined =====
- Marge Roukema, incumbent Representative from Ridgewood since 1981

==== Results ====
2002 Republican primary
| Party | Candidate | Votes | % |
|---|---|---|---|
| Republican | Scott Garrett | 16,234 | 44.99% |
| Republican | David C. Russo | 9,299 | 25.77% |
| Republican | Gerald Cardinale | 9,109 | 25.25% |
| Republican | Akram Yosri Abdelrahman | 773 | 2.14% |
| Republican | Brian Fox | 665 | 1.84% |
| Turnout | | 36,080 | 100.00% |

=== Democratic primary ===
==== Candidates ====
- Anne Sumers

==== Results ====
2002 Democratic primary
| Party | Candidate | Votes | % |
|---|---|---|---|
| Democratic | Anne Sumers | 6,365 | 100.00% |
| Turnout | | 6,365 | |

=== General election ===
==== Candidates ====
- Michael Cino (Independent)
- Scott Garrett, Assemblyman from Wantage and candidate for this seat in 1998 and 2000 (Republican)
- Anne Sumers (Democratic)

==== Predictions ====
| Source | Ranking | As of |
|---|---|---|
| Sabato's Crystal Ball | Lean R | November 4, 2002 |
| New York Times | Lean R | October 14, 2002 |

==== Results ====
New Jersey's 5th congressional district election, 2002
| Party | Candidate | Votes | % |
|---|---|---|---|
| Republican | Scott Garrett | 118,881 | 59.48% |
| Democratic | Anne Sumers | 76,504 | 38.28% |
| Independent | Michael Cino | 4,466 | 2.23% |
| Turnout | | 199,851 | |
| Republican hold | | | |

== District 6 ==
2002 New Jersey's 6th congressional district election
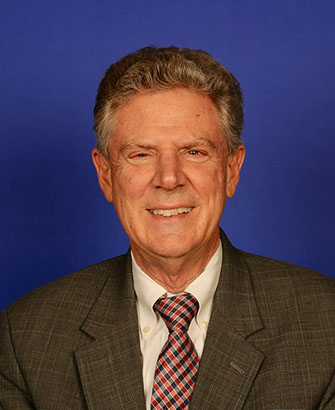

| Nominee | Frank Pallone Jr. | Ric Medrow |
| Party | Democratic | Republican |
| Popular vote | 91,379 | 42,479 |
| Percentage | 66.5% | 30.9% |
- County results *: 60–70% 70–80% 80–90%
U.S. Representative before election
Frank Pallone
Democratic
Elected U.S. Representative
incumbent
Democratic

Incumbent Democrat Frank Pallone defeated Republican challenger Ric Medrow. Between 2003 and 2013, this district covered parts of Monmouth, Middlesex, Somerset, and Union counties.

=== Democratic primary ===
==== Candidates ====
- Frank Pallone, incumbent Representative from Long Branch since 1988

==== Results ====
2002 Democratic primary
| Party | Candidate | Votes | % |
|---|---|---|---|
| Democratic | Frank Pallone (incumbent) | 11,005 | 100.00% |
| Turnout | | 11,005 | |

=== Republican primary ===
==== Candidates ====
- Ric Medrow

==== Results ====
2002 Republican primary
| Party | Candidate | Votes | % |
|---|---|---|---|
| Republican | Ric Medrow | 6,505 | 100.00% |
| Turnout | | 6,505 | |

=== General election ===
==== Candidates ====
- Barry Allen (Libertarian)
- Mac Dara Lyden (Independent)
- Ric Medrow (Republican)
- Frank Pallone, incumbent Representative from Long Branch since 1988 (Democratic)
- Richard Strong (Green)

==== Predictions ====
| Source | Ranking | As of |
|---|---|---|
| Sabato's Crystal Ball | Safe D | November 4, 2002 |
| New York Times | Safe D | October 14, 2002 |

==== Results ====
New Jersey's 6th congressional district election, 2002
| Party | Candidate | Votes | % |
|---|---|---|---|
| Democratic | Frank Pallone Jr. (incumbent) | 91,379 | 66.46% |
| Republican | Ric Medrow | 42,479 | 30.89% |
| Green | Richard Strong | 1,819 | 1.32% |
| Libertarian | Barry Allen | 1,206 | 0.88% |
| Independent | Mac Dara Lyden | 612 | 0.45% |
| Turnout | | 137,495 | |
| Democratic hold | | | |

== District 7 ==
2002 New Jersey's 7th congressional district election
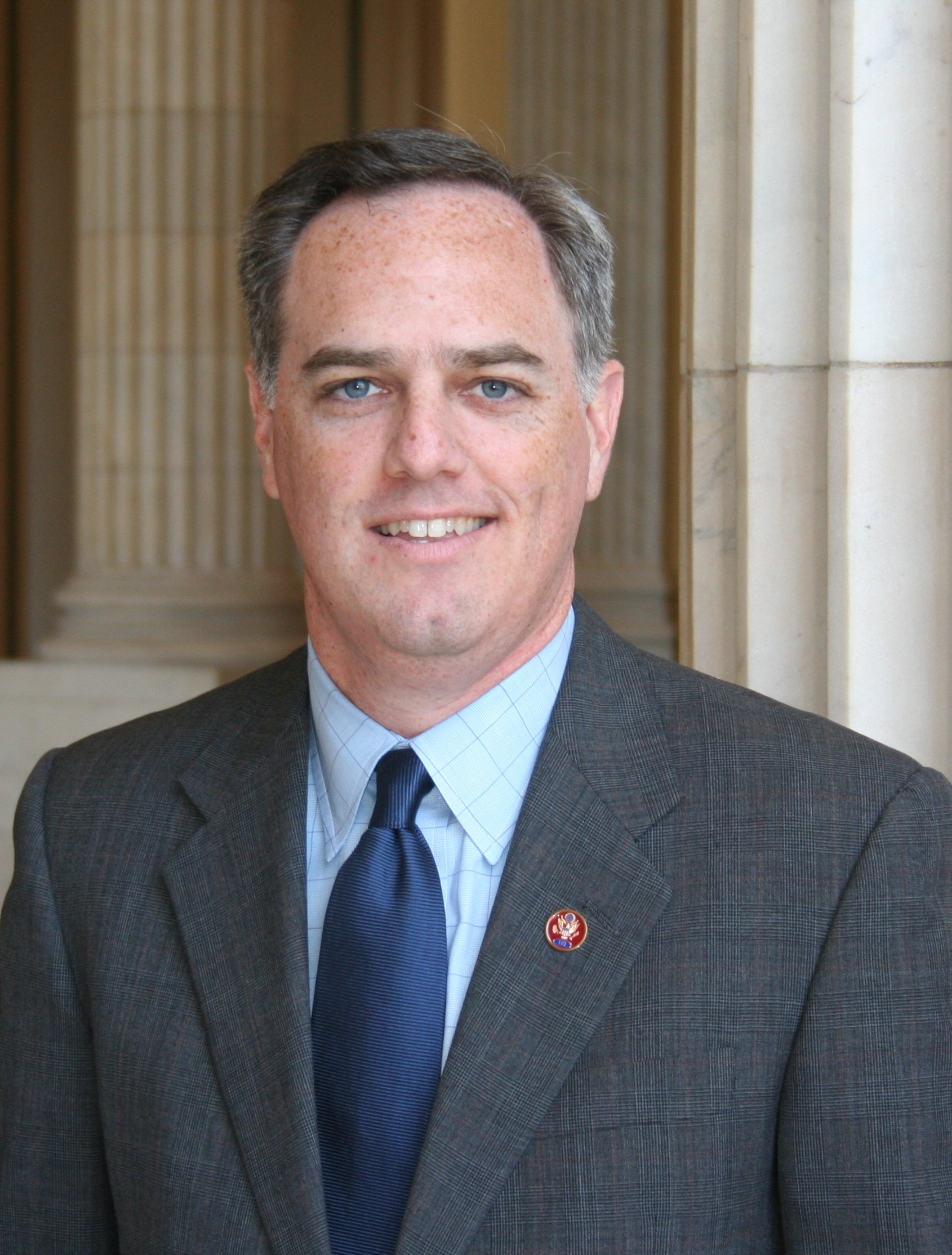

| Nominee | Mike Ferguson (incumbent) | Tim Carden |
| Party | Republican | Democratic |
| Popular vote | 106,055 | 74,879 |
| Percentage | 58.0% | 40.9% |
- County results *: 50–60% 60–70% Carden: 50–60%
U.S. Representative before election
Mike Ferguson
Republican
Elected U.S. Representative
incumbent
Republican

Incumbent Republican Mike Ferguson defeated Democratic challenger Tim Cardin. Between 2003 and 2013, this district covered parts of Middlesex, Union, Somerset, and Hunterdon counties.

=== Republican primary ===
==== Candidates ====
- Mike Ferguson, incumbent Representative from Union since 2001

==== Results ====
2002 Republican primary
| Party | Candidate | Votes | % |
|---|---|---|---|
| Republican | Mike Ferguson (incumbent) | 20,244 | 100.00% |
| Turnout | | 20,244 | |

=== Democratic primary ===
==== Candidates ====
- Tim Carden
- Tyrone Cass Ross

==== Results ====
2002 Democratic primary
| Party | Candidate | Votes | % |
|---|---|---|---|
| Democratic | Tim Carden | 6,217 | 90.67% |
| Democratic | Tyrone Cass Ross | 640 | 9.33% |
| Turnout | | 6,857 | |

=== General election ===
==== Candidates ====
- Tim Carden (Democratic)
- Mike Ferguson, incumbent Representative from Union since 2001 (Republican)
- Darren Young (Libertarian)

==== Predictions ====
| Source | Ranking | As of |
|---|---|---|
| Sabato's Crystal Ball | Safe R | November 4, 2002 |
| New York Times | Safe R | October 14, 2002 |

==== Results ====
New Jersey's 7th congressional district election, 2002
| Party | Candidate | Votes | % |
|---|---|---|---|
| Republican | Mike Ferguson (incumbent) | 106,055 | 57.95% |
| Democratic | Tim Carden | 74,879 | 40.92% |
| Libertarian | Darren Young | 2,068 | 1.13% |
| Turnout | | 183,002 | |
| Republican hold | | | |

== District 8 ==
2002 New Jersey's 8th congressional district election
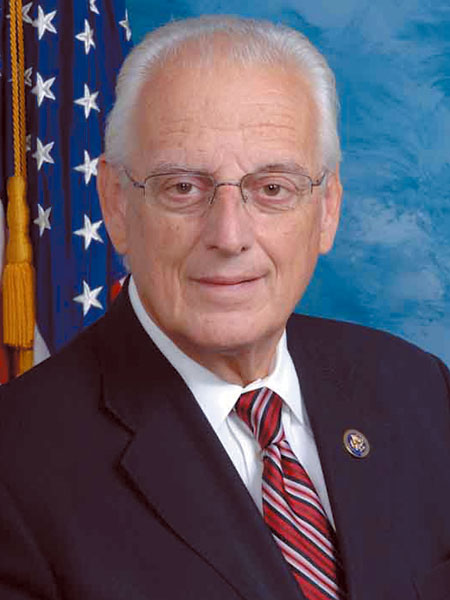

| Nominee | Bill Pascrell Jr. | Jared Silverman |
| Party | Democratic | Republican |
| Popular vote | 88,101 | 40,318 |
| Percentage | 66.8% | 30.6% |
- County results *: 60–70%
U.S. Representative before election
Bill Pascrell
Democratic
Elected U.S. Representative
incumbent
Democratic

Incumbent Democrat Bill Pascrell won. This district covers Essex and Passaic counties.

=== Democratic primary ===
==== Candidates ====
- Bill Pascrell, incumbent Representative from Paterson since 1997

==== Results ====
2002 Democratic primary
| Party | Candidate | Votes | % |
|---|---|---|---|
| Democratic | Bill Pascrell (incumbent) | 10,462 | 100.00% |
| Turnout | | 10,462 | |

=== Republican primary ===
==== Candidates ====
- Jared Silverman

==== Results ====
2002 Republican primary
| Party | Candidate | Votes | % |
|---|---|---|---|
| Republican | Ric Medrow | 6,505 | 100.00% |
| Turnout | | 6,505 | |

=== General election ===
==== Candidates ====
- Joseph Fortunato (Green)
- Bill Pascrell, incumbent Representative from Paterson since 1997 (Democratic)
- Jared Silverman (Republican)

==== Predictions ====
| Source | Ranking | As of |
|---|---|---|
| Sabato's Crystal Ball | Safe D | November 4, 2002 |
| New York Times | Safe D | October 14, 2002 |

==== Results ====
New Jersey's 8th congressional district election, 2002
| Party | Candidate | Votes | % |
|---|---|---|---|
| Democratic | Bill Pascrell Jr. (incumbent) | 88,101 | 66.83% |
| Republican | Jared Silverman | 40,318 | 30.59% |
| Green | Joseph Fortunato | 3,400 | 2.58% |
| Turnout | | 131,819 | |
| Democratic hold | | | |

== District 9 ==
2002 New Jersey's 9th congressional district election
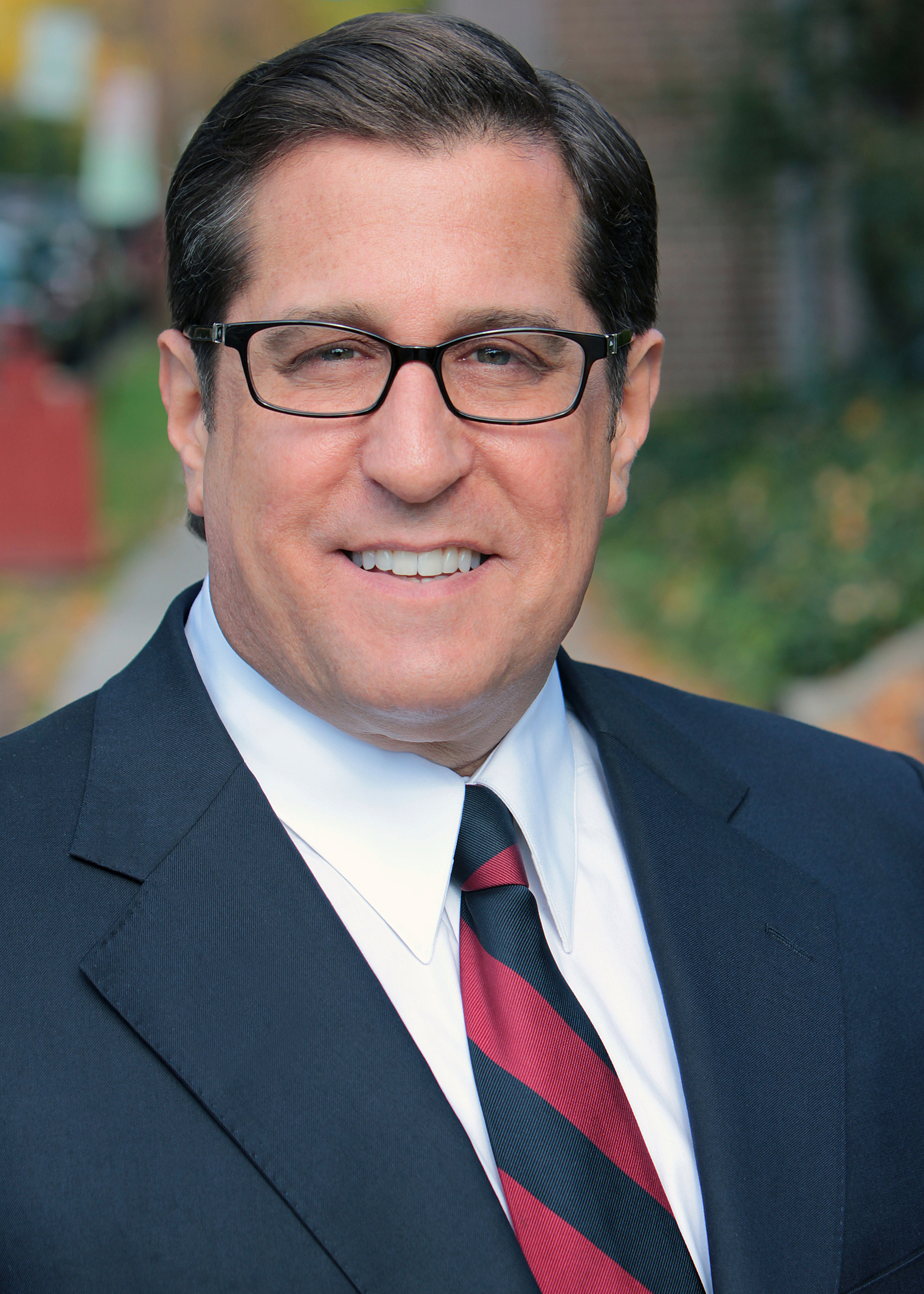

| Nominee | Steve Rothman | Joseph Glass |
| Party | Democratic | Republican |
| Popular vote | 97,108 | 42,088 |
| Percentage | 69.8% | 30.2% |
- County results *: 60–70% 70–80% Glass: 50–60%
U.S. Representative before election
Steve Rothman
Democratic
Elected U.S. Representative
incumbent
Democratic

Incumbent Democrat Steve Rothman won. This district covers most of Bergen County.

=== Democratic primary ===
==== Candidates ====
- Steve Rothman, incumbent Representative from Fair Lawn since 1997

==== Results ====
2002 Democratic primary
| Party | Candidate | Votes | % |
|---|---|---|---|
| Democratic | Steve Rothman (incumbent) | 16,362 | 100.00% |
| Turnout | | 16,362 | |

=== Republican primary ===
==== Candidates ====
- Joseph Glass

==== Results ====
2002 Republican primary
| Party | Candidate | Votes | % |
|---|---|---|---|
| Republican | Joseph Glass | 7,336 | 100.00% |
| Turnout | | 7,336 | |

=== General election ===
==== Candidates ====
- Joseph Glass (Republican)
- Steve Rothman, incumbent Representative from Fair Lawn since 1997 (Democratic)

==== Predictions ====
| Source | Ranking | As of |
|---|---|---|
| Sabato's Crystal Ball | Safe D | November 4, 2002 |
| New York Times | Safe D | October 14, 2002 |

==== Results ====
New Jersey's 9th congressional district election, 2002
| Party | Candidate | Votes | % |
|---|---|---|---|
| Democratic | Steve Rothman (incumbent) | 97,108 | 69.76% |
| Republican | Joseph Glass | 42,088 | 30.24% |
| Turnout | | 139,196 | |
| Democratic hold | | | |

== District 10 ==
2002 New Jersey's 10th congressional district election
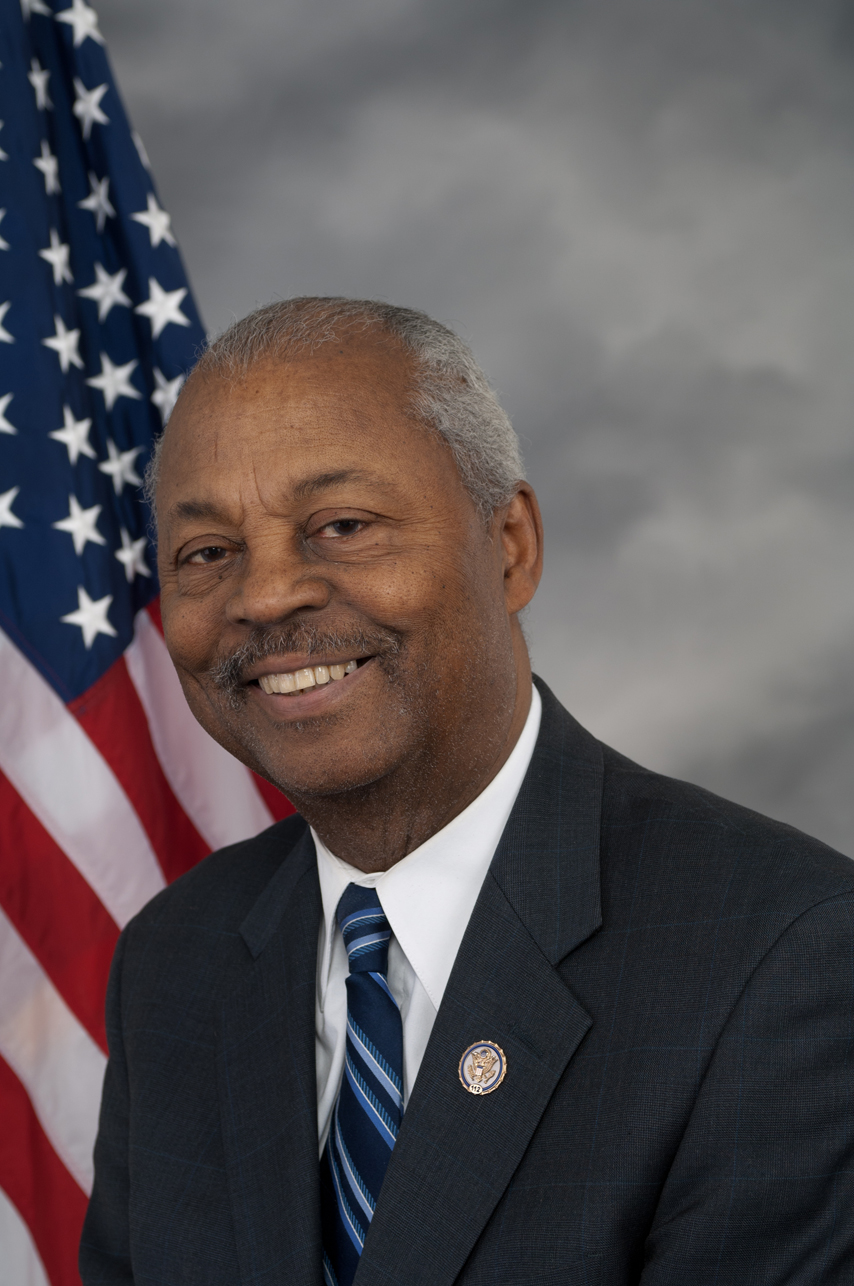

| Nominee | Don Payne | Andrew Wirtz |
| Party | Democratic | Republican |
| Popular vote | 86,433 | 15,913 |
| Percentage | 84.5% | 15.6% |
- County results *: 70–80% 80–90% 90–100%
U.S. Representative before election
Donald M. Payne
Democratic
Elected U.S. Representative
incumbent
Democratic

Incumbent Democrat Donald M. Payne won. This district covers a heavily urbanized area, which includes the city of Newark.

=== Democratic primary ===
==== Candidates ====
- Edward A. Allen
- Donald M. Payne, incumbent Representative from Newark since 1989
- Edmund Proctor

==== Results ====
2002 Democratic primary
| Party | Candidate | Votes | % |
|---|---|---|---|
| Democratic | Donald M. Payne (incumbent) | 33,851 | 84.09% |
| Democratic | Edward A. Allen | 3,583 | 8.90% |
| Democratic | Edmund Proctor | 2,818 | 7.00% |
| Turnout | | 40,252 | |

=== Republican primary ===
==== Candidates ====
- Andrew Wirtz

==== Results ====
2002 Republican primary
| Party | Candidate | Votes | % |
|---|---|---|---|
| Republican | Andrew Wirtz | 2,005 | 100.00% |
| Turnout | | 2,005 | |

=== General election ===
==== Candidates ====
- Donald M. Payne, incumbent Representative from Newark since 1989 (Democratic)
- Andrew Wirtz (Republican)

==== Predictions ====
| Source | Ranking | As of |
|---|---|---|
| Sabato's Crystal Ball | Safe D | November 4, 2002 |
| New York Times | Safe D | October 14, 2002 |

==== Results ====
New Jersey's 10th congressional district election, 2002
| Party | Candidate | Votes | % |
|---|---|---|---|
| Democratic | Don Payne (incumbent) | 86,433 | 84.45% |
| Republican | Andrew Wirtz | 15,913 | 15.55% |
| Turnout | | 102,346 | |
| Democratic hold | | | |

== District 11 ==
2002 New Jersey's 11th congressional district election
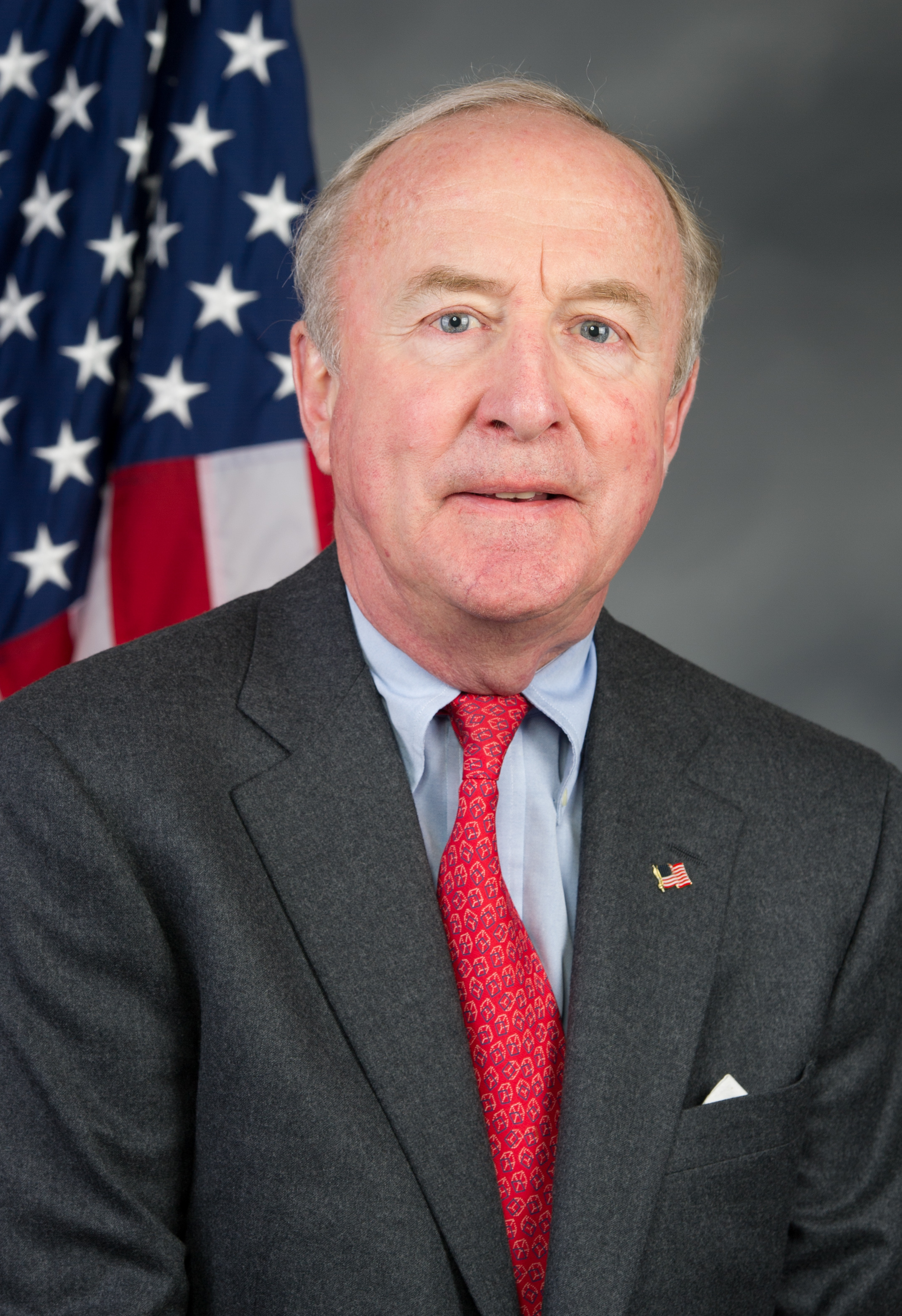

| Nominee | Rodney Frelinghuysen | Vij Pawar |
| Party | Republican | Democratic |
| Popular vote | 132,938 | 48,477 |
| Percentage | 72.4% | 26.4% |
- County results *: 60–70% 70–80%
U.S. Representative before election
Rodney Frelinghuysen
Republican
Elected U.S. Representative
incumbent
Republican

Incumbent Republican Rodney Frelinghuysen won. This district covers most of Morris County.

=== Republican primary ===
==== Candidates ====
- Rodney Frelinghuysen, incumbent Representative from Harding since 1995

==== Results ====
2002 Republican primary
| Party | Candidate | Votes | % |
|---|---|---|---|
| Republican | Rodney Frelinghuysen (incumbent) | 29,691 | 100.00% |
| Turnout | | 19,667 | |

=== Democratic primary ===
==== Candidates ====
- Vij Pawar

==== Results ====
2002 Democratic primary
| Party | Candidate | Votes | % |
|---|---|---|---|
| Democratic | Vij Pawar | 6,462 | 100.00% |
| Turnout | | 8,589 | |

=== General election ===
==== Candidates ====
- Rodney Frelinghuysen, incumbent Representative from Harding since 1995 (Republican)
- Vij Pawar (Democratic)
- Richard Roth (Libertarian)

==== Predictions ====
| Source | Ranking | As of |
|---|---|---|
| Sabato's Crystal Ball | Safe R | November 4, 2002 |
| New York Times | Safe R | October 14, 2002 |

==== Results ====
New Jersey's 11th congressional district election, 2002
| Party | Candidate | Votes | % |
|---|---|---|---|
| Republican | Rodney Frelinghuysen (incumbent) | 132,938 | 72.38% |
| Democratic | Vij Pawar | 48,477 | 26.39% |
| Libertarian | Richard Roth | 2,263 | 1.23% |
| Turnout | | 183,678 | |
| Republican hold | | | |

== District 12 ==
2002 New Jersey's 12th congressional district election
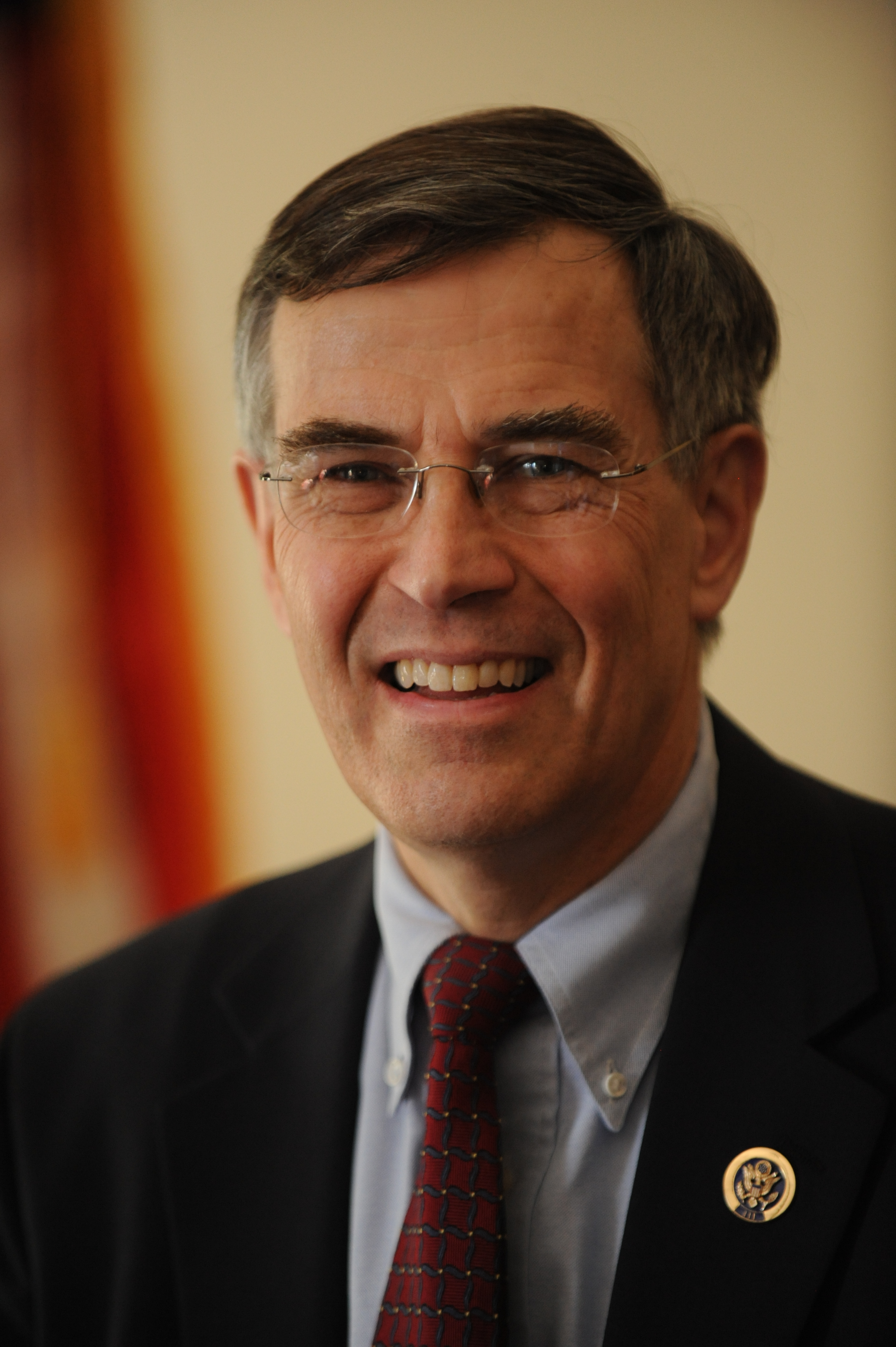

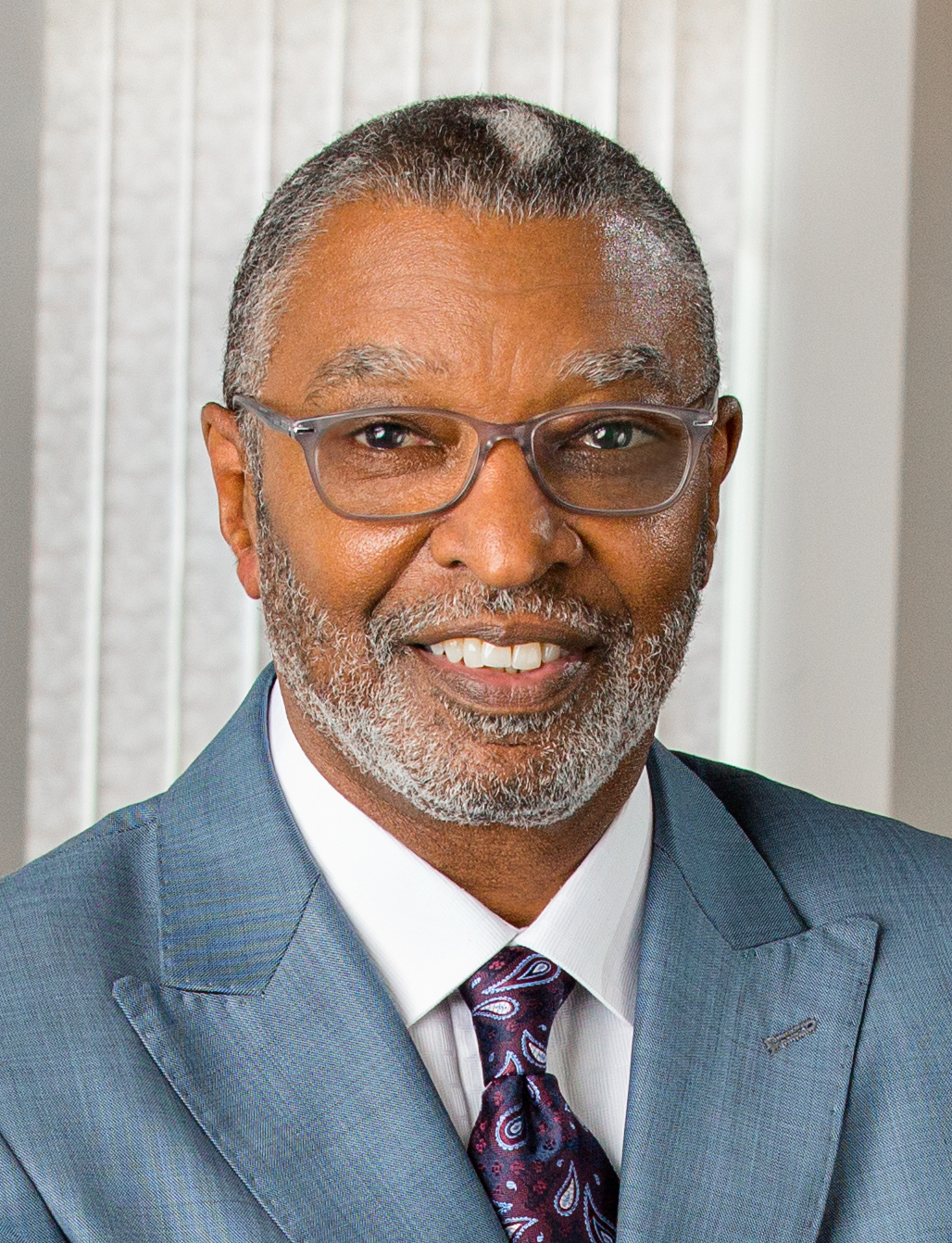
| Nominee | Rush Holt | DeForest Soaries |
| Party | Democratic | Republican |
| Popular vote | 104,806 | 62,938 |
| Percentage | 61.0% | 36.6% |
- County results *: 50–60% 60–70%
U.S. Representative before election
Rush Holt
Democratic
Elected U.S. Representative
incumbent
Democratic

Incumbent Democrat Rush Holt won. This district covers 5 suburban counties in the central part of the state.

=== Democratic primary ===
==== Candidates ====
- Rush Holt Jr., incumbent Representative from Pennington since 1999

==== Results ====
2002 Democratic primary
| Party | Candidate | Votes | % |
|---|---|---|---|
| Democratic | Rush Holt (incumbent) | 9,618 | 100.00% |
| Turnout | | 9,618 | |

=== Republican primary ===
==== Candidates ====
- Deborah Jones
- DeForest Soaries, Secretary of State of New Jersey

==== Results ====
2002 Republican primary
| Party | Candidate | Votes | % |
|---|---|---|---|
| Republican | DeForest Soaries | 9,596 | 80.63% |
| Republican | Deborah Jones | 2,306 | 19.37% |
| Turnout | | 11,902 | |

=== General election ===
==== Candidates ====
- Thomas Abrams (Libertarian)
- Rush Holt Jr., incumbent Representative from Pennington since 1999 (Democratic)
- Carl Mayer (Green)
- DeForest Soaries, Secretary of State of New Jersey (Republican)
- Karen Anne Zaletel (Independent)

==== Predictions ====
| Source | Ranking | As of |
|---|---|---|
| Sabato's Crystal Ball | Safe D | November 4, 2002 |
| New York Times | Safe D | October 14, 2002 |

==== Results ====
New Jersey's 12th congressional district election, 2002
| Party | Candidate | Votes | % |
|---|---|---|---|
| Democratic | Rush Holt (incumbent) | 104,806 | 61.04% |
| Republican | DeForest Soaries | 62,938 | 36.65% |
| Green | Carl Mayer | 1,871 | 1.09% |
| Libertarian | Thomas Abrams | 1,259 | 0.73% |
| Independent | Karen Anne Zaletel | 839 | 0.49% |
| Turnout | | 171,713 | |
| Democratic hold | | | |

== District 13 ==
2002 New Jersey's 13th congressional district election
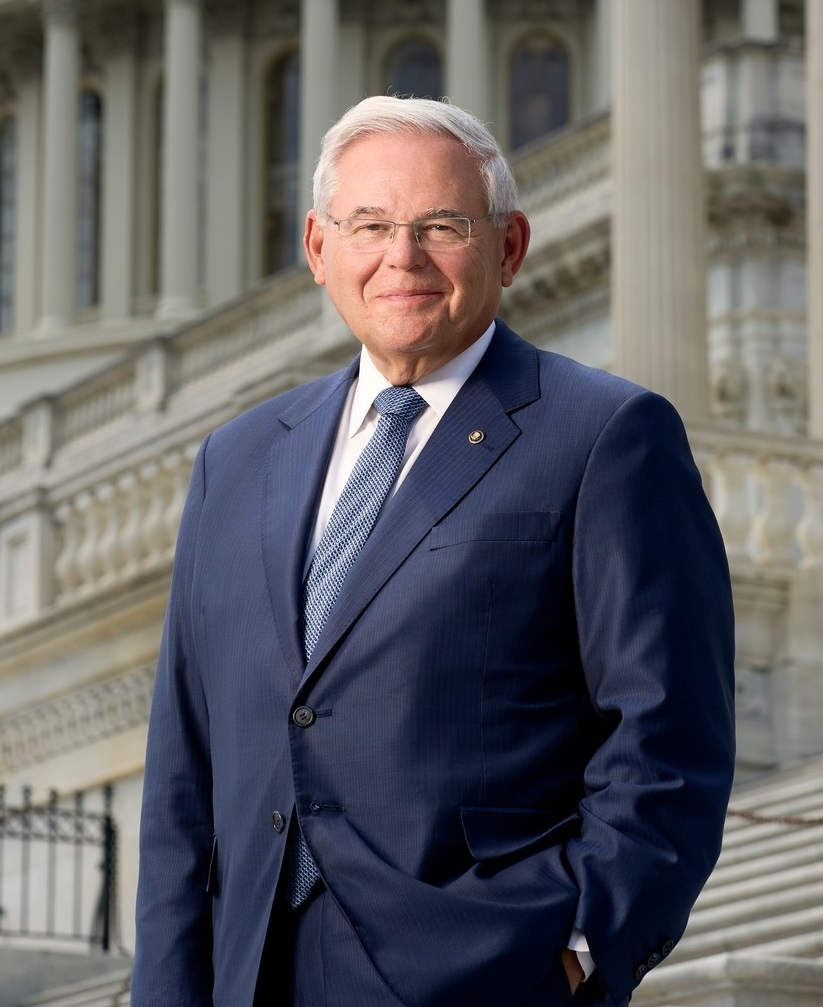

| Nominee | Bob Menendez | James Geron |
| Party | Democratic | Republican |
| Popular vote | 72,605 | 16,852 |
| Percentage | 78.3% | 18.2% |
- County results *: 70–80% 80–90%
U.S. Representative before election
Bob Menendez
Democratic
Elected U.S. Representative
incumbent
Democratic

Incumbent Democrat Bob Menendez won. This is a heavily urbanized district covering Hudson County.

=== Democratic primary ===
==== Candidates ====
- Bob Menendez, incumbent Representative from Union City since 1993

==== Results ====
2002 Democratic primary
| Party | Candidate | Votes | % |
|---|---|---|---|
| Democratic | Bob Menendez (incumbent) | 37,357 | 100.00% |
| Turnout | | 37,357 | |

=== Republican primary ===
==== Candidates ====
- James Geron

==== Results ====
2002 Republican primary
| Party | Candidate | Votes | % |
|---|---|---|---|
| Republican | James Geron | 3,420 | 100.00% |
| Turnout | | 3,420 | |

=== General election ===
==== Candidates ====
- Pat Henry Faulkner (Independent)
- James Geron (Republican)
- Dick Hester (Independent)
- Bob Menendez, incumbent Representative from Union City since 1993 (Democratic)
- Herbert Shaw, perennial candidate (Independent)
- Esmat Zaklama (Independent)

==== Predictions ====
| Source | Ranking | As of |
|---|---|---|
| Sabato's Crystal Ball | Safe D | November 4, 2002 |
| New York Times | Safe D | October 14, 2002 |

==== Results ====
New Jersey's 13th congressional district election, 2002
| Party | Candidate | Votes | % |
|---|---|---|---|
| Democratic | Bob Menendez (incumbent) | 72,605 | 78.3% |
| Republican | James Geron | 16,852 | 18.17% |
| Green | Pat Henry Faulkner | 1,195 | 1.29% |
| Independent | Esmat Zaklama | 774 | 0.83% |
| Independent | Dick Hester | 732 | 0.79% |
| Independent | Herbert Shaw | 573 | 0.62% |
| Turnout | | 92,731 | |
| Democratic hold | | | |
