= Regena Thomas =

American politician

31st Secretary of State of New Jersey
- In office 2002–2006
- Governor: James McGreevey; Richard Codey
- Preceded by: DeForest Soaries
- Succeeded by: Nina Mitchell Wells

Personal details
- Born: 1957 (age 68–69) Clinton, Kentucky, US
- Education: Morehead State University, New Brunswick Theological Seminary, Wesley Theological Seminary

Regena Thomas (born 1957) is the former secretary of state of New Jersey and a political consultant. She served in the cabinets of former governors James McGreevey and Richard Codey.

Thomas worked in the state government of Kentucky and local government of the District of Columbia. She specialized in political consulting and voter turnout for Democratic candidates. She later founded her own political consulting firm, and began working with statewide candidates in New Jersey. She managed get out the vote efforts for the 1996 U.S. Senate campaign of Robert Torricelli, the 2000 U.S. Senate campaign of Jon Corzine and McGreevey's 2001 campaign for governor. She also worked on Corzine's 2005 campaign for governor.

After McGreevey's 2001 election, he appointed Thomas to a four-year term as Secretary of State. As Secretary of State, Thomas held responsibility for the state archives, cultural affairs, minority affairs, volunteerism, Native American affairs, literacy, state history, and record keeping. McGreevey reportedly considered transferring state elections to the secretary of state from the New Jersey Attorney General's office, but received criticism because of Thomas' background in political consulting. State election administration had been under the secretary of state until former Governor Christine Todd Whitman transferred it to the attorney general.

During Thomas' tenure, she received criticism from state lawmakers for allegedly taking time off from her state office for political work. Thomas said she did any political work in her spare time and in 2004 she took a multi-month leave of absence to "recharge her batteries." Thomas spent part of this leave working on the presidential campaign of Massachusetts Senator John Kerry and North Carolina Senator John Edwards. It was reported that Thomas was interested in becoming United States Ambassador to Haiti if Kerry had won the 2004 presidential election.

As a part of Thomas' official duties as Secretary of State, she was charged with accepting McGreevey's resignation in November 2004. Thomas left office in January 2006 when her four-year constitutionally mandated term expired.

Thomas was promoted to director of community engagement, while continuing her current role as political department senior adviser in 2014.

Political offices
Preceded by DeForest Soaries	Secretary of State of New Jersey; 2002 – 2006	Succeeded by Nina Mitchell Wells
