= Nina Mitchell Wells =

American politician

32nd Secretary of State of New Jersey
- In office January 17, 2006 – January 19, 2010
- Governor: Jon Corzine
- Preceded by: Regena Thomas
- Succeeded by: Kim Guadagno

Personal details
- Born: September 9, 1950 (age 74); Washington, D.C., U.S.
- Political party: Democratic
- Spouse: Ted Wells (m. 1971)
- Education: Mount St. Joseph University; Newton College of the Sacred Heart (BA); Suffolk University (JD)

Nina Mitchell Wells (born September 9, 1950) is an American attorney and politician who served as Secretary of State of New Jersey in the cabinet of Governor Jon Corzine.

== Early life and education ==
Wells was born in Washington, D.C., where she attended Immaculate Conception Academy. Wells began college at Mount St. Joseph University before graduating from Newton College of the Sacred Heart with a B.A. in 1972. Wells then received her Juris Doctor from Suffolk University Law School in Boston, Massachusetts.

== Career ==
Prior to assuming her cabinet post in January 2006, Wells served as a vice president at Schering-Plough and assistant dean at Rutgers Law School.

As Secretary of State, Wells served one four-year term, concurrent to the term of the governor. Her term expired on January 19, 2010. As Secretary, she was the state's chief elections officer and oversaw tourism, historical affairs, cultural and arts programs, Native American affairs, literacy, volunteerism, the state archives.

In 2008, Wells was named as a defendant in the case Donofrio v. Wells, an attempt to force her to stay the presidential election in New Jersey pending investigations into the citizenship of Barack Obama. The case was ultimately unsuccessful.

In July 2024, after U.S. Senator Bob Menendez announced his resignation following his corruption conviction, Governor Phil Murphy began to consider appointing Wells to the Senate seat.

== Personal life ==
She and her husband, criminal defense lawyer Ted Wells, reside in Livingston, New Jersey. Wells is a Democrat.

Political offices
Preceded by Regena Thomas	Secretary of State of New Jersey; 2006–2010	Succeeded by Kim Guadagno
