= Theodore V. Wells, Jr. =

American lawyer (born 1950)

- Born: April 28, 1950 (age 76); Washington, D.C., U.S.
- Education: College of the Holy Cross (BA); Harvard University (JD, MBA)
- Organization: Harvard Corporation (2013–2025)
- Known for: Legal defense of Scooter Libby, Deflategate investigation
- Political party: Democratic
- Spouse: Nina Mitchell Wells (m. 1971)
- Awards: American Academy of Arts and Sciences (2020)

Theodore "Ted" Von Wells, Jr. (born April 28, 1950) is an American trial lawyer and defense attorney known for his practice in white-collar crime cases. He is a partner and co-chair of litigation at the law firm Paul, Weiss, Rifkind, Wharton & Garrison. From 2010 to 2025, he was one of twelve fellows of the Harvard Corporation, the governing board of Harvard University.

After graduating from the College of the Holy Cross in 1972, Wells earned his JD from Harvard Law School and his MBA from Harvard Business School in 1976. He is known for his representation of prominent financial and political figures, including Scooter Libby, Raymond Donovan, Mike Espy, Michael Milken, Frank Quattrone, and governors Eliot Spitzer and David Paterson.

== Early life and education ==
Wells was born in Washington, D.C., on April 28, 1950, and grew up in a rowhouse. He has a younger sister, Toni, and several half-brothers and half-sisters on his father's side. His mother, Phyllis Wells, was a mail clerk at the U.S. Department of the Navy from Virginia. His father, Theodore V. Wells Sr., was a taxi-driver. After his parents separated during his childhood, Wells was raised by his mother. He graduated from Calvin Coolidge High School in 1968, where he played center for the school's football team. In his junior year, he received athletic scholarships to play football at the University of Pittsburgh, Pennsylvania State University, Boston University, and North Carolina A&T State University.

After high school, Wells initially committed to play football at Pittsburgh, but withdrew to attend the College of the Holy Cross in Worcester, Massachusetts, to study economics instead, enrolling there on a scholarship provided by Tom Boisture. As an undergraduate at Holy Cross, Wells was classmates with U.S. Supreme Court justice Clarence Thomas, poet Edward P. Jones, and roommates with running-back Ed Jenkins. He played football for the Holy Cross Crusaders but withdrew after his freshman year to focus on coursework. He co-founded the college's Black Student Union (BSU) and became its chairman in his final year. In his senior year, Wells was named the Fenwick Scholar, the college's highest academic honor. He graduated from Holy Cross with a Bachelor of Arts in economics in 1972 with membership in Alpha Sigma Nu.

After graduating from Holy Cross, Wells won a full scholarship to pursue graduate studies at Harvard University, where he simultaneously enrolled in both Harvard Law School and Harvard Business School, earning his Juris Doctor (JD) and his Master of Business Administration (MBA), respectively, in 1976. In law school, he studied under law professors Derrick Bell, Morton Horwitz, and Phillip Areeda, and was classmates with Kenneth Chenault, Franklin Raines, and Charles Ogletree. He was also elected an editor of the Harvard Civil Rights–Civil Liberties Law Review and worked as a summer associate at PwC, Arnold & Porter, and Alston & Bird. He was one of only 43 black students at Harvard Law School at the time.

== Early legal career ==
From 1976 to 1977, Wells served as a law clerk for Judge John Joseph Gibbons of the United States Court of Appeals for the Third Circuit. He was Gibbons' second black clerk—the first being Arthur Martin, a fellow classmate at Holy Cross. Gibbons had met Wells when Wells was an undergraduate in 1969, and Gibbons became his close friend and mentor. During his time as a clerk, Wells met Samuel Alito, then a clerk for Judge Leonard I. Garth, and described him as "one of the smartest lawyers I’ve ever met."

After finishing his clerkship, Wells joined the law firm of Paul, Hastings, Janofsky & Walker in Los Angeles, California. Shortly afterwards, he moved to Lowenstein Sandler in Roseland, New Jersey. Wells became a partner at Lowenstein Sandler in 1982 and remained with the firm until 2000. During his early career, he also undertook pro bono representation of indigent defendants and taught at the Seton Hall University School of Law.

In 1983, Wells gained fame for his successful representation of Harold Ruvoldt, a Hudson County state prosecutor accused of bribery and extorting $115,000 from a real estate developer, despite having never tried a case at the time. Ruvolt was found not guilty and was acquitted of all charges on February 3, 1983, after being represented by Wells during the trial. Then in 1987, Wells became the lead defense attorney for U.S. Secretary of Labor Raymond Donovan, who went to trial for fraud charges that year. Wells received national attention when his representation of Donovan during the case's eight-month trial resulted in Donovan being found not guilty on all of his more than 100 counts.

Wells later represented former United States Secretary of Agriculture Mike Espy in a federal corruption prosecution concerning gifts and benefits received from companies and individuals with interests before the Department of Agriculture. Wells elected not to present defense witnesses, arguing that prosecutors had failed to establish their case. In December 1998, Espy was acquitted of all 30 remaining charges after a seven-week trial. The following year, Wells helped defend Tennessee financier Franklin L. Haney, who was acquitted of 42 charges involving alleged illegal campaign contributions to Democratic candidates.

== Paul, Weiss and criminal defense ==
In 2000, Wells joined the New York law firm Paul, Weiss, Rifkind, Wharton & Garrison, becoming co-chair of its litigation department. His practice at the firm has encompassed white-collar criminal defense, securities litigation, corporate investigations, and complex civil litigation.

Among his most prominent criminal defense engagements was his representation of Scooter Libby, the former chief of staff to Vice President Dick Cheney, during the federal prosecution arising from the disclosure of CIA officer Valerie Plame's identity. In March 2007, Libby was convicted of perjury, obstruction of justice, and making false statements to federal investigators. Wells argued unsuccessfully for a probationary sentence, and Libby was sentenced to 30 months in prison and fined $250,000. After President George W. Bush commuted Libby's prison sentence, Wells announced in December 2007 that his client would abandon his appeal.

Wells has also represented other prominent public figures, including former New York Governor Eliot Spitzer, former U.S. Senator Robert Torricelli, and former New York Governor David Paterson, in criminal or regulatory investigations. In 2023, he represented former Manhattan prosecutor Mark Pomerantz in legal proceedings concerning a subpoena issued by the United States House Committee on the Judiciary in connection with its examination of the prosecution of Donald Trump.

=== Corporate and securities litigation ===
Alongside his defense of public officials, Wells has represented major financial institutions and multinational corporations in civil and regulatory proceedings, including Citigroup, Merck & Co., Johnson & Johnson, Deutsche Bank, and JPMorgan Chase. In 2008, he helped represent Citigroup in litigation brought by the Italian dairy company Parmalat over alleged involvement in the accounting fraud that preceded Parmalat's collapse. A New Jersey jury rejected Parmalat's claims and awarded Citigroup approximately $364 million in damages on its counterclaims.

Wells also represented Citigroup in a fraud lawsuit brought by the British private equity firm Terra Firma Capital Partners over its 2007 acquisition of the music company EMI Group. In November 2010, a federal jury rejected Terra Firma's claim that Citigroup had misrepresented the existence of a competing bidder during the acquisition. However, the United States Court of Appeals for the Second Circuit vacated the verdict in 2013 and ordered a new trial, finding that the district court had incorrectly instructed the jury on applicable English law. The parties subsequently dismissed the remaining New York claims in 2014, and related proceedings in England were dismissed with prejudice in 2016.

His work in the pharmaceutical industry has included representing Merck in federal investigations concerning the painkiller Vioxx and Johnson & Johnson in investigations concerning the marketing of Risperdal. Wells has also represented financial institutions in investigations concerning securities trading, anti-money-laundering regulations, and alleged violations of the Foreign Corrupt Practices Act.

Wells served as lead counsel for ExxonMobil in a securities fraud lawsuit brought by the New York Attorney General alleging that the company had misled investors about the financial risks associated with climate change. In December 2019, New York Supreme Court Justice Barry Ostrager ruled in ExxonMobil's favor, finding that the state had failed to establish violations of New York's securities fraud laws concerning the company's disclosures.

Wells was also involved in ExxonMobil's defense against a separate securities class action concerning the company's accounting for Canadian oil sands and Rocky Mountain natural gas assets. Although he initially served as lead trial counsel, he subsequently transferred that responsibility to attorney Tom Melsheimer and continued advising the trial team. In May 2026, a federal jury in Dallas returned a verdict for ExxonMobil and three former executives, rejecting the investors' claims of securities fraud.

=== National Football League investigations ===
In November 2013, the National Football League retained Wells to investigate allegations of bullying and workplace misconduct involving players on the Miami Dolphins. His report, released in February 2014, concluded that Dolphins players Richie Incognito, John Jerry, and Mike Pouncey had engaged in a pattern of harassment directed at teammate Jonathan Martin, another offensive lineman, and an assistant trainer. The investigation documented racial insults, sexually explicit taunts, and other conduct that the report characterized as workplace bullying.

Wells subsequently led the NFL's investigation into allegations that the New England Patriots had improperly deflated footballs during the 2014 AFC Championship Game, a controversy widely known as Deflategate. In May 2015, Wells released a 243-page report concluding that it was more probable than not that Patriots personnel had deliberately violated league rules concerning football inflation and that quarterback Tom Brady was at least generally aware of the activity. The Patriots publicly challenged the report's conclusions, issuing a detailed response disputing aspects of its evidence and methodology. Following criticism from Brady's representatives, Wells defended the independence and fairness of his investigation and rejected allegations that its conclusions had been influenced by the NFL.

== Awards and honors ==
Outside his litigation practice, Wells served as chairman of the board of directors of the NAACP Legal Defense and Educational Fund. He has also provided pro bono legal services as general counsel to the New Jersey NAACP and the New Jersey Democratic Party. In 2011, the NAACP Legal Defense and Educational Fund awarded him its Thurgood Marshall Lifetime Achievement Award.

In September 2012, Wells was elected to the Harvard Corporation, the university's principal governing board, with his term beginning in January 2013. He has additionally served as a trustee of the College of the Holy Cross and as an instructor in Harvard Law School's trial advocacy program.

Wells was named Lawyer of the Year in 2006 by The National Law Journal, which also included him among its list of the decade's most influential lawyers in 2010. He received the New York Law Journal's Lifetime Achievement Award in 2017 and was named Trial Lawyer of the Year by Benchmark Litigation in 2019. In 2020, Wells was elected to the American Academy of Arts and Sciences in recognition of his contributions to the legal profession.

== Personal life ==
Wells married his high school girlfriend, Nina Mitchell, in 1971. He and his wife reside in Livingston, New Jersey. He has two children: Teresa and Philip.
