= DeForest Soaries =

American politician

The Reverend DeForest "Buster" Soaries
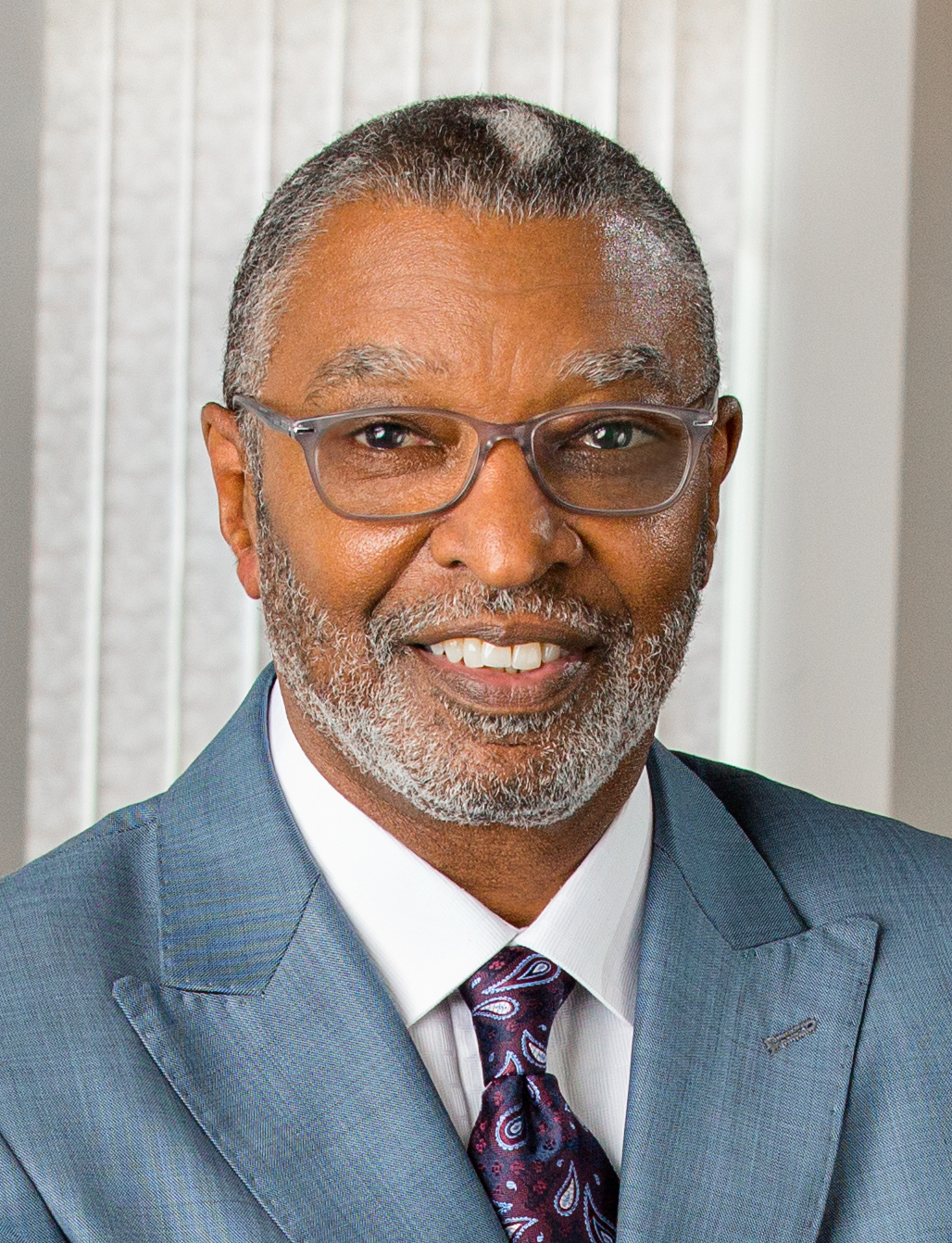
- Soaries in 2017

30th Secretary of State of New Jersey
- In office January 1999 – January 2002
- Governor: Christine Todd Whitman; Donald DiFrancesco
- Preceded by: Lonna Hooks
- Succeeded by: Regena Thomas

Personal details
- Born: August 20, 1951 (age 75) Brooklyn, New York, U.S.
- Party: Republican
- Education: Fordham University (BA); Princeton Theological Seminary (MDiv); United Theological Seminary (DMin)

The Reverend DeForest Blake "Buster" Soaries, Jr. (born August 20, 1951) is a Baptist minister, author and public advocate, from Montclair, New Jersey. A member of the Republican Party, He is the former Secretary of State of New Jersey and former chairman of the federal Election Assistance Commission. An African-American, he was the senior pastor of First Baptist Church of Lincoln Gardens in Somerset, New Jersey, a position he had held since November 1990 until his retirement from the church in June 2021.

== Personal life ==
A resident of the Monmouth Junction section of South Brunswick, New Jersey, he is married to Margaret Donna Soaries (Pleasant). The couple have twin sons, Malcolm and Martin.

Soaries received a Bachelor of Arts from Fordham University; a Master of Divinity degree from Princeton Theological Seminary; and a Doctor of Ministry degree from United Theological Seminary. He has also received five honorary doctorate degrees from other institutions.

== First Baptist Church of Lincoln Gardens ==
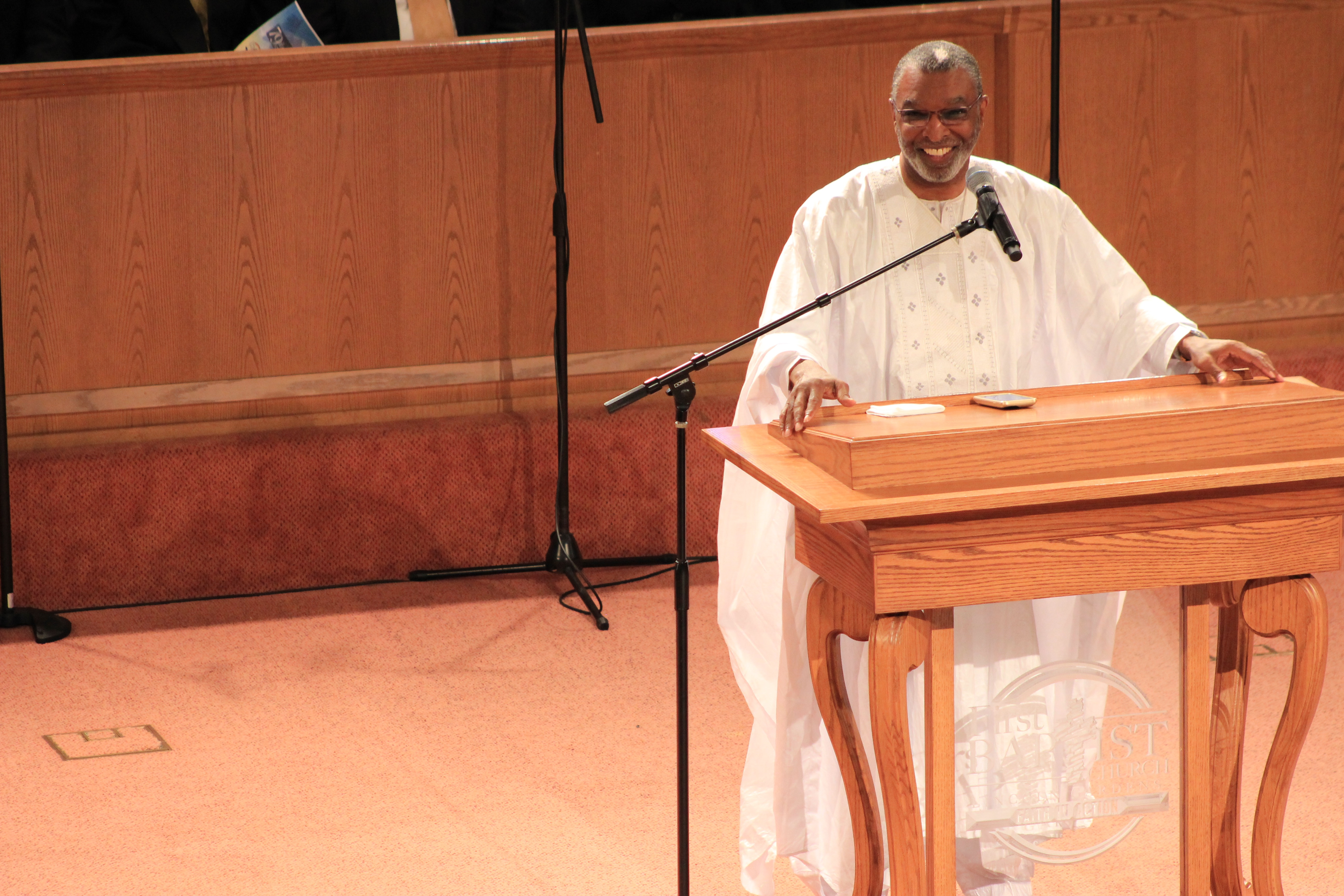
First Baptist Church of Lincoln Gardens 79th Anniversary Service

Soaries had served as the senior pastor of First Baptist Church of Lincoln Garden (FBCLG) in Somerset, New Jersey, from November 1990 until his retirement in June 2021.

== Politics ==
From January 1999 to January 2002, Soaries served as Secretary of State of New Jersey, making him the first African-American male to do so. He served under then-governor Christine Todd Whitman. In that position he endorsed further funding for the arts, and served as an unofficial general advisor to the governor. He also created V-FREE, a statewide youth violence prevention program.

In 2002, Soaries was the Republican candidate for the U.S. House of Representatives from the 12th C.D. of New Jersey, losing to incumbent Democrat Rush D. Holt, Jr. In 2003, he was appointed to the federal Election Assistance Commission, which was established by Congress to implement the Help America Vote Act of 2002, and served as chairman.

A proponent of faith-based community development, and of President Bush's faith-based initiative, Soaries, through church donations, formed several non-profit community development agencies, including the Renaissance Community Development Credit Union, Renaissance Education & Technology Academy and the Harvest of Hope Family Services Network.

Soaries was chosen by Coretta Scott King as the keynote speaker at the 2000 Martin Luther King Jr. celebration in Atlanta. He has also worked for the Urban League and Operation PUSH.

== Central Jersey Community Development Corporation ==
In 1992, Soaries founded the Central Jersey Community Development Corporation (CJCDC): a 501(c)(3) non-profit organization that specializes in revitalizing distressed neighborhoods. Central Jersey Community Development Corporation (CJCDC) incorporated in 1993. The organization's mission is to “rebuild communities, one family at a time” by improving the social, educational and economic conditions in targeted areas in Central Jersey. Its goal is to impact the lives of low to moderate income families to help them develop a better quality of life. Its vision is to preserve family institutions and help make individuals better community members. CJCDC has a long history of helping vulnerable communities in New Jersey come into transition, namely by positioning then for improvement, economic growth and sustainability.

CJCDC's neighborhood revitalization efforts are based on the notion that there is a role that people must play in their own uplift. There are social enterprise led by grass-roots organizations that are very close to the people who have need. If supported and empowered, they can help people who otherwise would be stuck in poverty.

== Harvest of Hope Family Services Network, Inc. ==
In 1996, Soaries founded the Harvest of Hope Family Services Network, Inc. (HOH). Harvest of Hope Family Network Services, Inc. is a faith-based organization that recruits and trains churches, agencies and community organizations to use HOH unique and proven strategies for recruiting families to foster and adopt children.

The Harvest of Hope Program created a systematic approach designed to identify, recruit and train potential foster parents. Initial recruitment efforts focused exclusively on First Baptist Church of Lincoln Gardens. Within a matter of weeks, 85 families were recruited and licensed as foster family homes in the State of New Jersey. More importantly, all 57 boarder babies were placed in Harvest of Hope recruited and trained foster family homes. The success of this initial intervention gave rise to the creation of Harvest of Hope Family Services Network, Inc. (HOH), a new, First Baptist affiliated not-for-profit entity that developed and trained a network of churches throughout New Jersey to do what was done at First Baptist Church of Lincoln Gardens: recruit families to become foster family homes for youth in foster care.

Harvest of Hope Family Services Network, Inc., expanded their services to include extensive pre and post placement support for foster-parent recruits who successfully completed the program to become DCP&P approved homes for child placement. This support included a major emphasis on retention activities, life skills and behavioral health training, in addition to liaison and advocacy assistance – all designed to provide ongoing care, nurture and stable homes to children in need. In addition, the Harvest of Hope program grew to include the placement of children, teens and sibling groups. For many years, Harvest of Hope managed a family reunification component that provided assistance to the New Jersey State DCP&P in the facilitation of the placement of children into appropriate homes as well as in-service training for existing foster families.

== Current activities ==
Soaries serves as an independent director at three companies: Independence Realty Trust, Federal Home Loan Bank of New York and Ocean Financial Corporation.

Political offices
Preceded by Lonna Hooks	Secretary of State of New Jersey; 1999–2002	Succeeded by Regena Thomas
