= Rush Holt Jr. =

American scientist and politician (born 1948)

Rush Holt
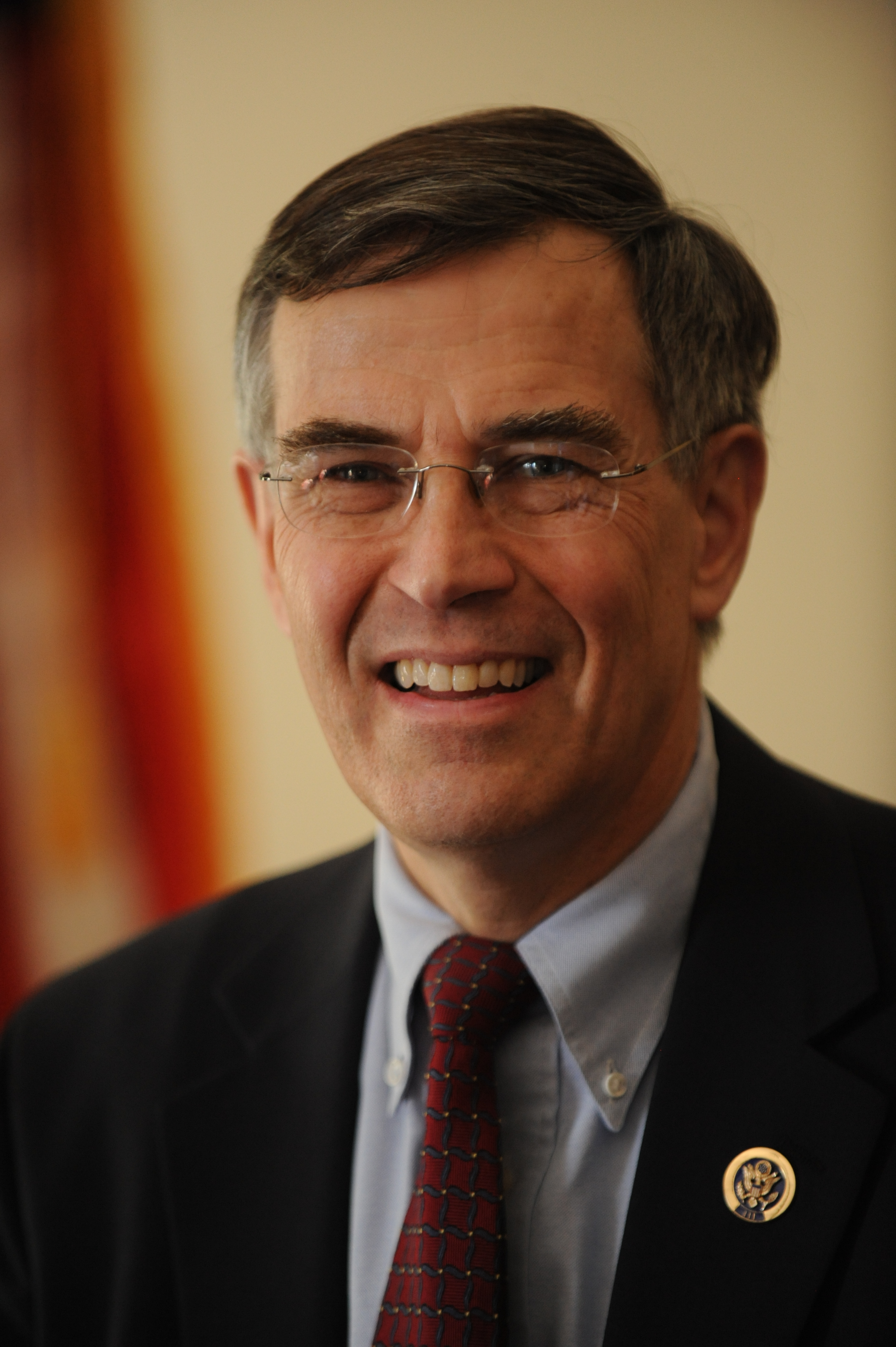

Member of the U.S. House of Representatives from New Jersey's 12th district
- In office January 3, 1999 – January 3, 2015
- Preceded by: Mike Pappas
- Succeeded by: Bonnie Watson Coleman

Personal details
- Born: Rush Dew Holt Jr. October 15, 1948 (age 78) Weston, West Virginia, U.S.
- Party: Democratic
- Spouse: Margaret Lancefield
- Children: 3
- Parents: Rush Holt Sr. (father); Helen Froelich (mother)
- Education: Carleton College (BS); New York University (MS, PhD)
- Scientific career
- Fields: Physics
- Workplaces: Swarthmore College; Princeton Plasma Physics Laboratory
- Thesis: Calcium Absorption Lines and Solar Activity: A Systematic Program of Observations (1981)
- Doctoral advisor: Henry Stroke

Rush Dew Holt Jr. (born October 15, 1948) is an American physicist and politician who served as the U.S. representative for New Jersey's 12th congressional district from 1999 to 2015. He is a member of the Democratic Party and son of former West Virginia U.S. Senator Rush D. Holt Sr. He worked as a professor of public policy and physics, and during his tenure in Congress he was one of two physicists and the only Quaker there.

Holt sought the Democratic nomination in the 2013 special primary election to fill the seat of U.S. Senator Frank Lautenberg, who died in office on June 3, 2013. He lost the nomination to Newark Mayor Cory Booker. Holt announced on February 18, 2014 that he would not seek re-election to the U.S. House that year.

In February 2015, Holt became chief executive officer of the American Association for the Advancement of Science (AAAS) and executive publisher of the Science family of journals. He served in that role until his retirement in September 2019.

== Early life and education ==
Holt was born in Weston, West Virginia, to Rush Holt Sr. (1905–1955), who served as a United States Senator from West Virginia (1935–1941), and his wife, Helen Froelich Holt (1913–2015), the first woman to be appointed Secretary of State of West Virginia (1957–1959). The senior Holt was the youngest person ever to be popularly elected to the U.S. Senate, at age 29. He died of cancer when Rush Jr. was six years old in 1955.

In 1966, Holt graduated from Landon School in Bethesda, Maryland. In 1970, he graduated Phi Beta Kappa with a BS in physics from Carleton College. In 1981, he received an MS and PhD in physics from New York University. His PhD thesis was "Calcium absorption lines and solar activity: a systematic program of observations."

== Academic career ==
Holt was a faculty member at Swarthmore College from 1980 to 1988 where he taught physics, public policy, and religion courses. During that time, he also worked as a Congressional Science Fellow for U.S. Representative Bob Edgar of Pennsylvania. From 1987 until 1989, Holt headed the Nuclear and Scientific Division of the Office of Strategic Forces at the U.S. Department of State. Holt was the Assistant Director of the Princeton Plasma Physics Laboratory at Princeton University, the University's largest research facility and the largest center for energy research in New Jersey.

=== Scientific journal articles ===
- Holt, Rush D. (June 1995). "The interaction of researchers with teachers: What scientists can offer elementary and secondary schools". Physics of Plasmas. 2 (6): 2605. Bibcode:1995PhPl....2.2605H. doi:10.1063/1.871223.
- Holt, Rush D (October 1990). "Magnetic Fusion". Science. 250 (4979): 359. Bibcode:1990Sci...250..359H. doi:10.1126/science.250.4979.359-b. PMID 17793003. S2CID 38290534.
- Holt, Rush D.; Mullan, D. J. (1987). "Shifts of the CaII K line in HeI 10830 dark points". Solar Physics. 107 (1): 63–72. Bibcode:1986SoPh..107...63H. doi:10.1007/BF00155342. S2CID 118512625.

=== Patent ===
- 4,249,518 Method for maintaining a correct density gradient in a non-convecting solar pond

== U.S. House of Representatives (1999–2015) ==
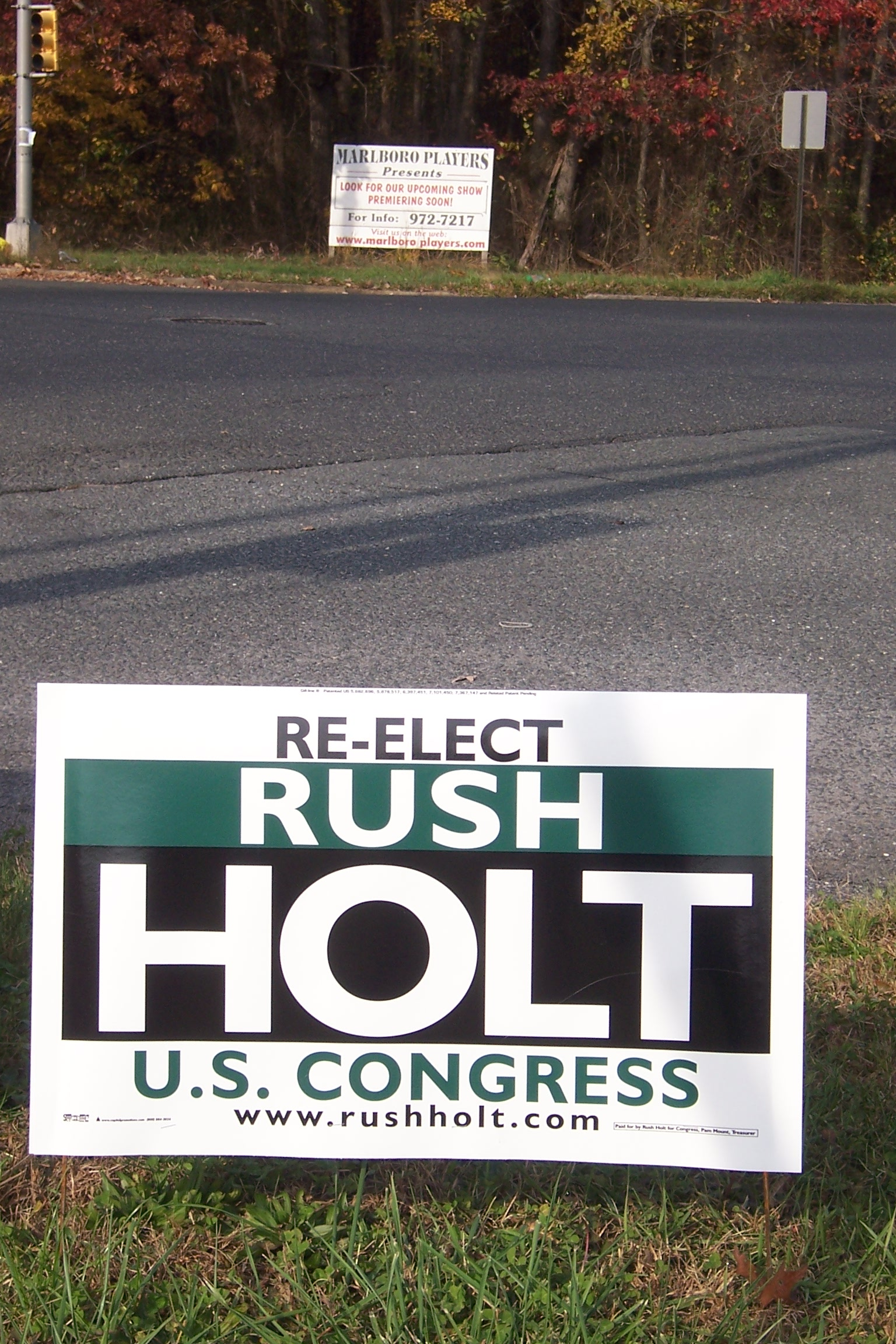
A Rush Holt yard sign along Route 520 in Marlboro Township, New Jersey during his successful 2008 re-election campaign.

=== Elections ===
1996

Holt first ran for Congress in 1996 in New Jersey's 12th congressional district after incumbent Republican congressman Dick Zimmer decided to run for the U.S. Senate. On June 4, 1996, Holt lost the Democratic party primary, receiving 24% of the vote and finishing last of the three candidates. Lambertville Mayor David DelVecchio won the primary with 45% of the vote and Carl Mayer finished second with 31% of the vote. Holt received the most votes in Mercer County, while losing the other four counties in the district to DelVecchio and Mayer: DelVecchio won Monmouth, Hunterdon, and Somerset Counties while Mayer won Middlesex County. DelVecchio went on to lose the general election to Republican Michael Pappas.

1998

Holt decided to run again in 1998. On June 2, 1998, Holt won the Democratic primary, defeating Carl Mayer 64% to 36%. Holt challenged one-term Congressman Michael Pappas. The incumbent's campaign experienced a setback after he read a poem, set to the tune of "Twinkle Twinkle Little Star", praising Kenneth Starr on the floor of the House of Representatives. Holt defeated Pappas by 4 percentage points, 51% to 47%, becoming the first Democrat to represent the district in two decades. Holt won Mercer (61%) and Middlesex (60%) while losing Monmouth (48%), Hunterdon (37%), and Somerset (40%).

2000

Holt was challenged by former Republican Congressman Dick Zimmer in the 2000 election. Holt's prior win was thought by Republicans to be a fluke, and the race attracted considerable money and advertising. The election was hotly contested and the winner was not known on election day. Zimmer was ahead on election night by just a few votes, but Holt was ahead the next day. Ten days after the election, Holt declared himself the winner by 481 votes. Zimmer challenged the results, but conceded after the count began to go against him. Holt ultimately won the election by a margin of 651 votes: 146,162 votes for Holt (48.730%) compared to Zimmer's 145,511 (48.513%), making it the only general election where Holt did not receive a majority of the votes in the election. Holt won Mercer (61%) and Middlesex (56%) while losing Monmouth (48%), Hunterdon (35%), and Somerset (37%).

2002

Redistricting after the 2000 census made Holt's district more Democratic. It added much of Trenton while losing conservative-leaning territory in Somerset and Hunterdon counties. While Holt faced a fairly well-funded challenge from Republican Secretary of State of New Jersey Buster Soaries, Holt easily won a third term, taking 61% to Soaries' 38%. He won all five counties: Mercer (68%), Middlesex (63%), Somerset (54%), Hunterdon (54%), and Monmouth (52%).

2004

Holt won re-election to a fourth term, defeating Republican Bill Spadea 59% to 40%. He won four of five counties: Mercer (72%), Somerset (62%), Middlesex (59%), and Hunterdon (52%). He lost Monmouth (48%).

2006

He won re-election to a fifth term, defeating former Helmetta, New Jersey Council President Joseph Sinagra, 66% to 34%. He won all five counties: Mercer (77%), Somerset (67%), Middlesex (65%), Hunterdon (61%), and Monmouth (56%).

2008

He won re-election to a sixth term, defeating Holmdel, New Jersey Deputy Mayor Alan Bateman, 63% to 35%. He won all five counties: Mercer (77%), Somerset (66%), Middlesex (64%), Hunterdon (55%), and Monmouth (50%).

2010

Holt raised $2,229,432 in the 2010 election cycle and spent $1,891,463. 72% came from individual donations, and 26% from PAC donations. Holt's former employer, Princeton University, was his single biggest donor, giving $56,863. Holt's opponent, Scott Sipprelle, raised $1,541,776 and spent $1,327,946. 65% of Sipprelle's funds came from self-financing. Independent Kenneth Cody refused to accept any donations. Holt won re-election to a seventh term, defeating Sipprelle, 53% to 46%. He won three of five counties: Mercer (70%), Somerset (60%), and Middlesex (52%). He lost Hunterdon (43%) and Monmouth (38%).

2012

After redistricting in 2011, the 12th District became even more Democratic. All of the Republican-leaning portions of Hunterdon County and Monmouth County were taken out of the 12th district while the Democratic-leaning towns of Plainfield, Scotch Plains, Fanwood, Middlesex, Dunellen, Bound Brook, South Bound Brook, Manville, East Windsor Township, and Hightstown were added to the 12th district. Additionally, sections of Trenton, Franklin Township & Old Bridge Township which were formerly located in the 4th and 6th Congressional districts, respectively, were also added to the 12th district. Only four counties remained: Mercer, Somerset, Middlesex, and now Union.

Holt won re-election to an 8th term, defeating Republican businessman Eric Beck 69% to 29%. He won all four counties Mercer (77%), Union (73%), Somerset (69%), and Middlesex (62%). On February 18, 2014, Rush Holt announced that he would not seek re-election to the House of Representatives in 2014.

=== Tenure ===
Holt was also only the second research physicist to be elected to Congress, and the first physicist to be elected as a Democrat; he joined Vern Ehlers (R-MI) and was later joined by Bill Foster (D-IL). Foster is currently the only research physicist in the U.S. House of Representatives with the retirement of Ehlers, and Foster defeating Judy Biggert in 2012 to reenter the House. Holt's supporters produced green bumper stickers reading "My Congressman IS a rocket scientist!", reflecting his scientific background.

Holt is one of two members of Congress to have participated on the American television game show Jeopardy!, the other being Senator John McCain of Arizona. Both appeared on the Fleming era of the television series with Holt winning five games. Holt's official Congressional website mentioned his being a five-time winner, as did some of his campaign materials. On February 28, 2011, Holt participated in a non-televised exhibition Jeopardy! match against the IBM computer Watson along with four other members of Congress (Jim Himes, Nan Hayworth, Jared Polis and Bill Cassidy). Holt bested the computer $8,600 to $6,200 in a single-round match.

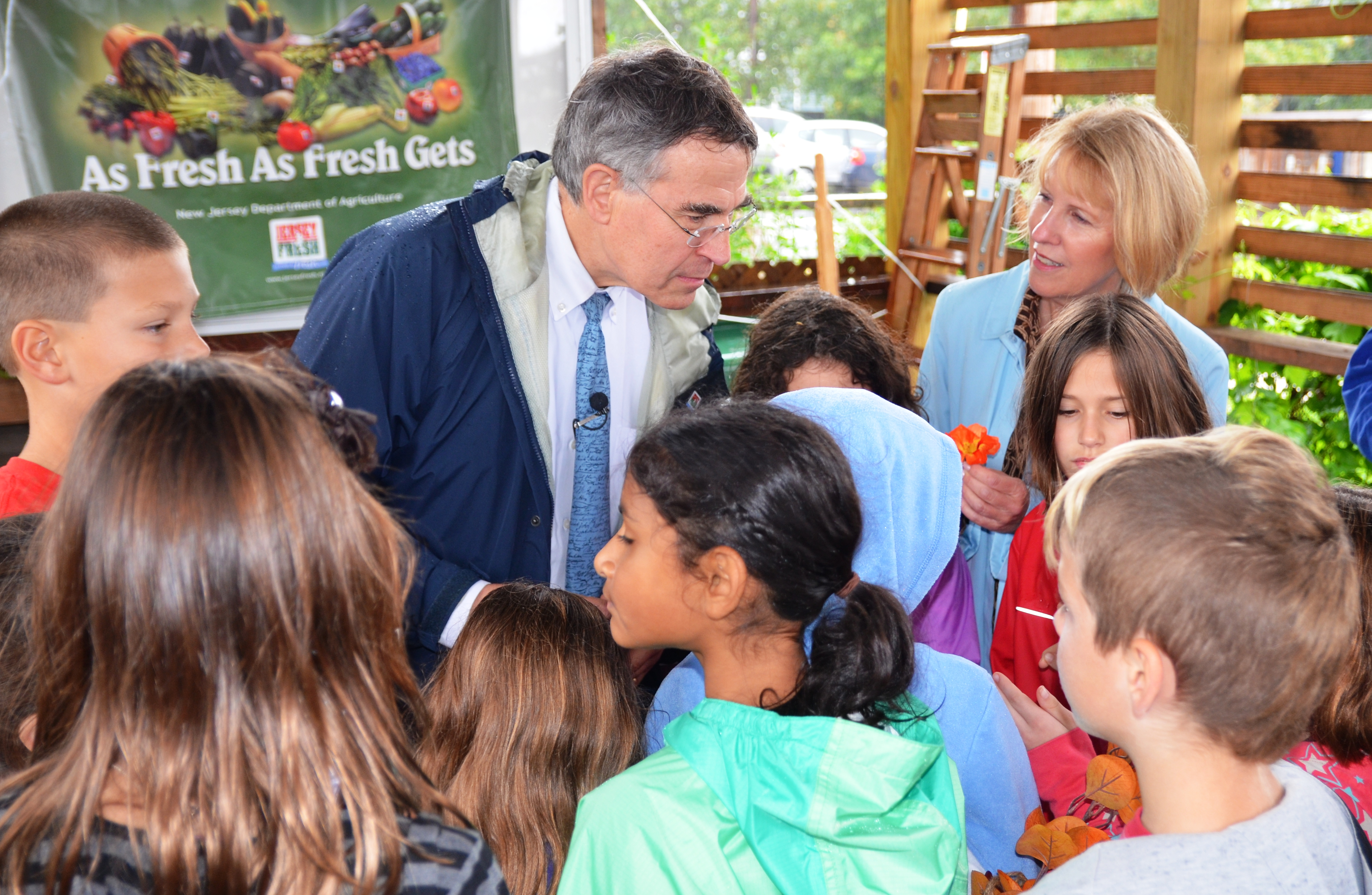
Holt at an event with a USDA official and youth of his district.

As a Congressman, Holt maintained liberal viewpoints on several major issues, and consistently voted accordingly. For example, he supported abortion rights, opposed the privatization of Social Security, and supported a public health care option. Several of his legislative priorities included tax credits for small businesses, increasing access to a college education for middle-class families, maintaining Medicare and Social Security, and preserving the environment.

In 2009, the National Journal rated him as one of the eight most liberal members of the House of Representatives. Holt's rankings released by various interest groups reflect his liberal views. Since 2009, he has been rated 100 percent in accordance with the interests of the following interest groups, among others: American Public Health Association, Americans for Democratic America, and NARAL Pro-Choice America.

Holt was a member of the New Democrat Coalition and the Congressional Progressive Caucus. In the 113th Congress, he served as co-chair of the Energy Task Force in the New Democrat Coalition. He received a grade of 100% on the progressive Drum Major Institute's 2005 and 2007 Congressional Scorecards on middle-class issues, and he was consistently scored well by that organization.

Environment

As a member of the House Committee on Natural Resources, Holt supported legislation to clean up the environment and cap greenhouse gas emissions, and he promoted the development and use of alternative energy sources. He reintroduced the Big Oil Bailout Prevention Act in 2011, co-sponsored the No New Drilling Act in 2012 to prevent new oil drilling on the Outer Continental Shelf, co-sponsored the Oceans Conservation, Education, and National Strategy for the 21st Century Act (H.R. 21), founded the Children's Environmental Health Caucus to raise awareness about environmental issues pertaining to children's health, and secured funding to preserve open space and recreation areas.

On September 21, 2012, Holt voted against the Stop the War on Coal Act of 2012 (H.R. 3409), a bill passed in the House (233 - 175). On July 30, 2010, he voted for the Offshore Drilling Regulations and Other Energy Law Amendments Bill (H.R. 3534), which passed in the House. On June 26, 2009, Holt voted for the Energy and Environmental Law Amendments ("Cap and Trade") Bill (H.R. 2454), which passed in the House by a narrow margin of 219 to 212. He also voted for the Renewable Energy Credits and Other Business and Individual Credits Bill (H.R. 7060) to extend energy efficiency tax credits, as well as various individual and business tax credits.

Holt maintained a 100 percent lifetime rating from the League of Conservation Voters since 1999, in addition to a 100 percent rating by Environment America in 2008, 2009, and 2011, and a 100 percent rating by Defenders of Wildlife Action Fund from 2003 to 2008. On November 12, 2012, the New Jersey Sierra Club awarded Holt the Outstanding Achievement Award for his environmental conservation efforts.

A September 2012 Nature article featured Holt and his rare background as a research scientist: "[Holt] thinks what is equally important is having more scientific thinking, even among the non-scientists in government ... [Holt states], 'I'm more interested in the way that scientists are trained to deal with uncertainty, to deal with evidence and statistical reasoning, things that are lacking in the political debate.' When it comes to global warming, for instance, Representative Holt says we don't need people in Congress who understand atmospheric pressure, or glaciation. We simply need them to be open to the idea that evidence might disprove what they think they know. And that, he says, is thinking like a scientist."

Discussing science's role in policy and government, Holt points out a fallacy in the way people think about science: "The ethic in the profession is that you stick to your science, and if you're interested in how science affects public policy or public questions, just let the facts speak for themselves. Of course, there's a fallacy there, too. Facts are, by themselves, voiceless."

Education

Holt is a strong supporter of educational initiatives, but questions the ways in which science is taught. "Our real problem is not that we're failing to produce excellent scientists, because we are [producing them], but rather that we have failed to maintain an appreciation for and understanding of science in the general population." He is concerned that science education since 1958 may have created a population that is largely disconnected from scientific thinking. "We left behind about 80% of the population because we teach science in the schools primarily for future scientists." Holt emphasizes the importance to all citizens of empirically-based thinking:

"The genius of science is that it will make ordinary people capable of making very smart decisions. We've lost that idea ... a lot of ordinary Americans feel they not only can't comprehend evidence but that it has little relevance for them and has no place in their lives. Climate change comes along and instead of asking, "What's the evidence," they say, "I don't believe in it."

While co-chair of the Research and Development Caucus, a member of the House Committee on Education and Labor, and serving on the National Commission on Mathematics and Science Teaching for the 21st Century, Holt worked on crafting several comprehensive education policies. He helped write the College Cost Reduction Act - the largest college aid expansion bill since the GI bill - which drastically reduced student loan interest rates and included Holt's provision to provide upfront tuition assistance for math, science, and foreign language teachers. He also helped establish the "American Opportunity" tax credit to alleviate the burden of college tuition for low- and moderate-income students. Furthermore, Holt helped enact the Education Jobs and Medicaid Assistance Act, which provides states with funding to reduce budget shortfalls and keep teachers in their classrooms.

For his significant legislative work on and support for all education initiatives, but also for legislation to strengthen national security through expansion and improvement of foreign language study, and to increase foreign language capacity in the U.S. intelligence community and throughout the federal government by expanding education in critical need foreign languages, Holt received the Foreign Language Advocacy Award from the Northeast Conference on the Teaching of Foreign Languages in 2005.

On May 28, 2010, Holt voted in support of the Science and Technology Funding Bill (H.R. 5116), a bill passed in the House that provided funding for science and technology research and development purposes.

Formerly the Assistant Director at Princeton University's Princeton Plasma Physics Laboratory, Holt sought to promote involvement in programs of STEM fields. He successfully defended funding for the Department of Education's Mathematics and Science Partnerships programs. As a result of his efforts, he was repeatedly given an "A" rating by the National Education Association after 2007, along with a 100 percent approval rating by the National Association for College Admission Counseling in 2006 and 2009–2011.

On January 22, 2013, Holt introduced a resolution designating February 12, 2013 (Charles Darwin's 204th birthday), as "Darwin Day" in order to recognize "the importance of sciences in the betterment of humanity".

Social issues

On his website, Holt stated, "Since coming to Congress, I have fought for fairness in health care coverage, worked to protect victims of domestic violence and sexual assault, supported equal pay for equal work, and sought gender equity in schools." While a Congressman, he strongly believed in women's right to make decisions about their health care, without interference by the government, and supported Roe v. Wade.

Holt successfully opposed legislation that would have prevented access to birth control, eliminated funding for Title X (the national family planning program), and denied federal funding to Planned Parenthood. Planned Parenthood and the National Family Planning & Reproductive Health Association consistently issued an approval rating of 100 percent for Holt beginning in 1995, while the NARAL Pro-Choice America rated Holt 100 percent beginning in 1999.

Holt also sponsored the Helping Seniors Choose their Medicare Drug Plan Act (H.R. 3152), which increased the access that low-income healthcare recipients have to prescription drugs under Medicare and Medicaid. With the Protection Against Wrongful Voter Purges Act (H.R. 3835), Holt attempted to regulate the removal of voters' names from eligibility lists to ensure the validity of those lists. With the Judicious Use of Surveillance Tools in Counterterrorism Efforts (JUSTICE) Act of 2009 (H.R. 4005), Holt increased limits on governmental power with respect to counterterrorism efforts.

=== Committee assignments ===
- Committee on Education and the Workforce
  - Subcommittee on Higher Education and Workforce Training
  - Subcommittee on Health, Employment, Labor, and Pensions
- Committee on Natural Resources
  - Subcommittee on Energy and Mineral Resources (Ranking Member)
  - Subcommittee on Public Lands and Environmental Regulation

=== Caucus memberships ===
- Research and Development Caucus (founder, co-chair)
- Historic Preservation Caucus (co-chair)
- Biomedical Research Caucus (co-chair)
- Sustainable Energy and Environment Coalition (vice chair)
- Alzheimer's Caucus
- Children's Environmental Health Caucus
- Diabetes Caucus
- International Conservation Caucus
- Renewable Energy Caucus
- Sustainable Development Caucus
- Congressional Arts Caucus

== 2013 U.S. Senate election ==
On June 6, 2013, Holt became the first Democrat to become a candidate in the special election to fill the U.S. Senate seat vacated by the death of Frank Lautenberg. He lost the August 13, 2013, primary to Cory Booker. Booker was subsequently elected to the Senate in 2013, and re-elected in 2014.

== Post-congressional career ==
As Holt's final term in Congress was ending, the American Association for the Advancement of Science (AAAS) announced that he would become its chief executive officer and executive publisher of the Science family of journals, succeeding Alan I. Leshner. Upon accepting the position, Holt praised the AAAS mission statement and said, "Fostering science and public engagement and advancing science in international affairs is what I've been doing for decades in one way or another." He serves on the Advisory Board of the Journal of Science Policy & Governance. He retired from AAAS in September, 2019.

Holt is currently a member of the ReFormers Caucus of Issue One.

U.S. House of Representatives
Preceded by Michael Pappas	Member of the U.S. House of Representatives from New Jersey's 12th congressional district 1999–2015	Succeeded by Bonnie Watson Coleman
U.S. order of precedence (ceremonial)
Preceded by Steve Rothman as Former U.S. Representative	Order of precedence of the United States as Former U.S. Representative	Succeeded by Albio Sires as Former U.S. Representative
