= Election audit =

Review of a finished election

An election audit is any review conducted after polls close for the purpose of determining whether the votes were counted accurately (a results audit) or whether proper procedures were followed (a process audit), or both.

Both results and process audits can be performed between elections for purposes of quality management, but if results audits are to be used to protect the official election results from undetected fraud and error, they must be completed before election results are declared final.

Election recounts are a specific type of audit, with elements of both results and process audits.

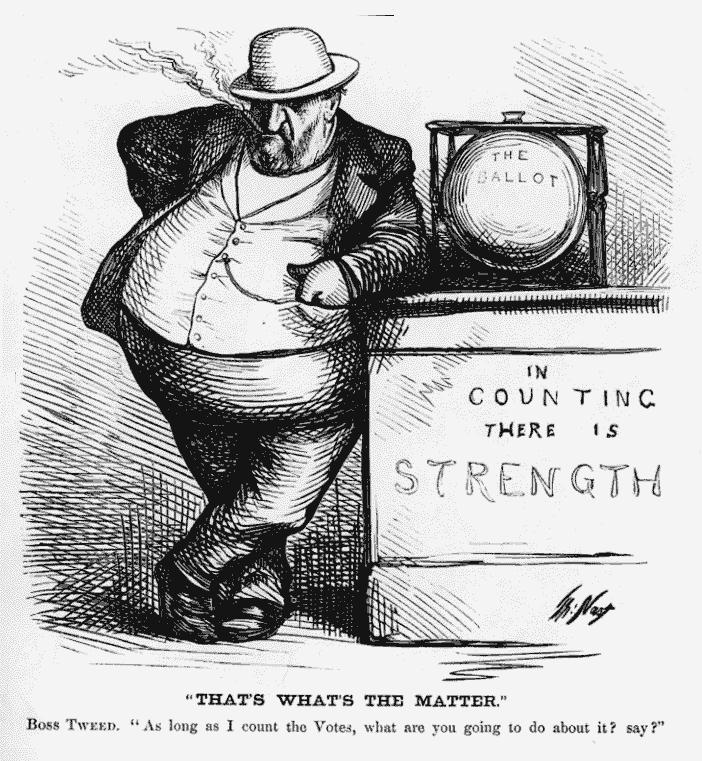
Boss Tweed: As long as I count the votes, what are you going to do about it?

== The need for verification of election results ==
In jurisdictions that tabulate election results exclusively with manual counts from paper ballots, or 'hand counts', officials do not need to rely on a single person to view and count the votes. Instead, valid hand-counting methods incorporate redundancy, so that more than one person views and interprets each vote and more than one person confirms the accuracy of each tabulation. In this way, the manual count incorporates a confirmation step, and a separate audit may not be considered necessary.

However, when votes are read and tabulated electronically, confirmation of the results' accuracy must become a separate process.

Within and outside elections, use of computers for decision support comes with certain IT risks. Election-Day electronic miscounts can be caused by unintentional human error, such as incorrectly setting up the computers to read the unique ballot in each election and undetected malfunction, such as overheating or loss of calibration. Malicious intervention can be accomplished by corrupt insiders at the manufacturer, distributor or election authority, or external hackers who access the software on or before Election Day.

Computer-related risks specific to elections include local officials’ inability to draw upon the level of IT expertise available to managers of commercial decision-support computer systems and the intermittent nature of elections, which requires reliance on a large temporary workforce to manage and operate the computers. Voting machines are usually air-gapped from the internet, but they receive updates from flash drives which do come from the internet, and in any case air-gapped computers are regularly hacked through flash drives and other means. Besides traditional security risks such as lock-picking and phishing attacks, voting machines are often unattended in public buildings the night before the election. This physical access lets outsiders subvert them.

To reduce the risk of flawed Election-Day output, election managers like other computer-dependent managers rely on testing and ongoing IT security. In the field of elections management, these measures take the form of federal certification of the electronic elections system designs, though there is no way to know the certified software is what is actually installed; security measures in the local election officials’ workplaces; and pre-election testing.

A third risk-reduction measure is performed after the computer has produced its output: Routinely checking the computers' output for accuracy, or auditing. Outside elections, auditing practices in the private sector and in other government applications are routine and well developed. In the practice of elections administration, however, the Pew Charitable Trusts stated in 2016, “Although postelection audits are recognized as a best practice to ensure that voting equipment is functioning properly, that proper procedures are being followed, and that the overall election system is reliable, the practice of auditing is still in its relative infancy. Therefore, a consensus has not arisen about what constitutes the necessary elements of an auditing program.”

Routine results audits also support voter confidence by improving election officials' ability to respond effectively to allegations of fraud or error.

=== Examples of wrong outcomes found by audits ===
In 2012 in Palm Beach County, FL, a routine audit which hand-counted a sample of precincts, changed the outcomes in two Wellington City council contests. Votes in each contest were reported for a different contest. The problem did not occur in the county's other 15 municipalities.

=== Examples of intrusions into election computers ===
Computers which tally votes or compile election results are known to have been hacked in the US in 2014 and 2016, Ukraine in 2014, and South Africa in 1994.

== Audit challenges unique to election results ==
Confirming that votes were credited to the correct candidates’ totals might seem to be a relatively uncomplicated task, but election managers face several audit challenges not present for managers of other decision-support IT applications. Primarily, ballot privacy prevents election officials from associating individual voters with individual ballots. This makes it impossible for election officials to use some standard audit practices such as those banks use to confirm that ATMs credited deposits to the correct account.

Another challenge is the need for a prompt and irrevocable decision. Election results need to be confirmed promptly, before officials are sworn into office. In many commercial uses of information technology, managers can reverse computer errors even when detected long after the event. However, once elected officials are sworn into office, they begin to make decisions such as voting on legislation or signing contracts on behalf of the government. Even if the official were to be removed because a computer error was discovered to have put that official in office, it would not be possible to reverse all the consequences of the error.

The intermittent nature of elections is another challenge. The number of elections managed by an election authority ranges from two per year (plus special elections) in five US states to one every 4 years (plus by-elections) in parliamentary systems like Canada where different election authorities manage national, provincial and municipal elections. This intermittency limits the development of a full-time, practiced workforce, for either the elections or the audits. Turning election audits over to an independent, disinterested professional accounting firm is another option not available to election officials. Because election results affect everyone, including the election officials themselves, truly disinterested auditors do not exist. Therefore, audit transparency is required to provide credibility.

== Attributes of a good election results audit ==
No governing body or professional association has yet adopted a definitive set of best practices for election audits. However, in 2007 a group of election-integrity organizations, including the Verified Voting Foundation, Common Cause, and the Brennan Center for Justice at NYU School of Law collaborated with the American Statistical Association to produce a set of recommended best practices for post-election results audits:

- Transparency: The public must be allowed to observe, verify, and point out procedural mistakes in all phases of the audit. This requires that audit procedures and standards be adopted, in written form, and made available before the election.
- Independence: While the actual work of post-election audits may be best performed by the officials who conduct the elections, the authority and regulation of post-election audits should be independent of officials who conduct the elections.
- Paper Records: Vote-counting in the audit should be performed with hand-to-eye counts of voter-marked, voter-verified paper ballots.
- Ballot Accounting (chain of custody, or internal control): The records used in the audit must be verified to be true and complete records of the election.
- Confirmation of the correct winners: The audits must reach statistical confidence that the computer-tabulated results identified the correct winners.
- Addressing Discrepancies: When discrepancies are found, investigation is conducted to determine cause of the discrepancies.
- Comprehensive: The ballot-sample selection process includes all jurisdictions and all ballot types (e.g., absentee, mail-in and accepted provisional ballots).
- Additional Targeted Samples: The audit includes a limited non-random sample selected on the basis of factors useful for building voter confidence or improving election management, such as Election-Day problems or preliminary results that deviate significantly from historical voting patterns.
- Binding on Official Results: Post-election audits must be completed before election results are declared official and final, and must either verify or correct the outcome.

== Current practices in election results auditing ==
=== India ===
India has designed and uses voting machines with one button per candidate. The button, when pressed, prints the selected candidate on a slip of paper (VVPAT), displays it to the voter, drops the slip into a box and tallies a vote for the candidate. The VVPAT is easy for voters to check, since voters only have one vote to cast, for one member of the lower house of Congress. However, there is no way to correct the vote if the VVPAT shows an error. The software is encoded on the machines' chip in a way that it cannot be examined. Brookings found that India's adoption of voting machines cut paper ballot stuffing noticeably in states with the most election prosecutions, and led to more voting by disadvantaged populations. Originally the voting machines lacked a paper trail, and VVPATs were added in 2013-2019 because of doubts about security of unchecked machines.

India hand tallies paper VVPATs from a 1.5% sample of election machines on the last evening of voting, before releasing results. In the April–May 2019 elections, the Election Commission of India hand-tallied the slips of paper from 20,675 voting machines (out of 1,350,000 or 1,730,000 machines) and found discrepancies for 8 machines, usually of four votes or less. Most machines tally over 16 candidates, and they did not report how many of these candidate tallies were discrepant. They formed investigation teams to report within ten days, were still investigating in November 2019, with no report as of June 2021 though the VVPATs themselves were destroyed in September 2019. Hand tallies before and after 2019 had a perfect match with machine counts.

=== Venezuela ===
Venezuela has direct entry voting machines which tally electronically and also give the voter a printed paper with the votes, a Voter-verified paper audit trail (VVPAT). The voter puts the paper in a ballot box corresponding to that machine.

A bipartisan team of experts certifies the software just before the election, and obtains a hash code to identify the correct software.

At the end of election day a random sample of machines is chosen, the paper is counted publicly, compared to the machine totals for each candidate, and an audit report is given to the top two candidates' representatives, and to the military to take to the National Electoral Council (Venezuela). Nationally 30% to 55% of machines are checked in this way on election night.

In 2024 the opposition was not allowed to be present at many of the voting stations for the audit, and challenged the results. They said they had won based on results from 83% of polling places. They posted the results online and convinced foreign governments, while the Electoral Council did not post its tallies.

=== Table of audit rules in India and Venezuela ===
List of Election Audit Practices in India
Location	Number of Contests Audited	Sample Size	Which Units Are Sampled?	Excluded from Audits	Method of Auditing Ballots	Do Audits Revise Election Outcomes?	Deadline, days after election day	Level of Discrepancy to Trigger Action	Action if Discrepancy	State Gets Report?	Law	Rules	2020 Population (Millions)
India	All (each election has 1 contest)	1.5%	voting machines	none	Hand tally	Maybe	Same day as last day of election	Any	Try to determine cause	Yes	2019 Supreme Court decision established sample size		1380
Venezuela	All?	53%	voting machines	none	Hand tally	Maybe	Same day as last day of election	Any	Report	Yes			28

== Current practices in election results auditing in the United States ==
=== Overview ===
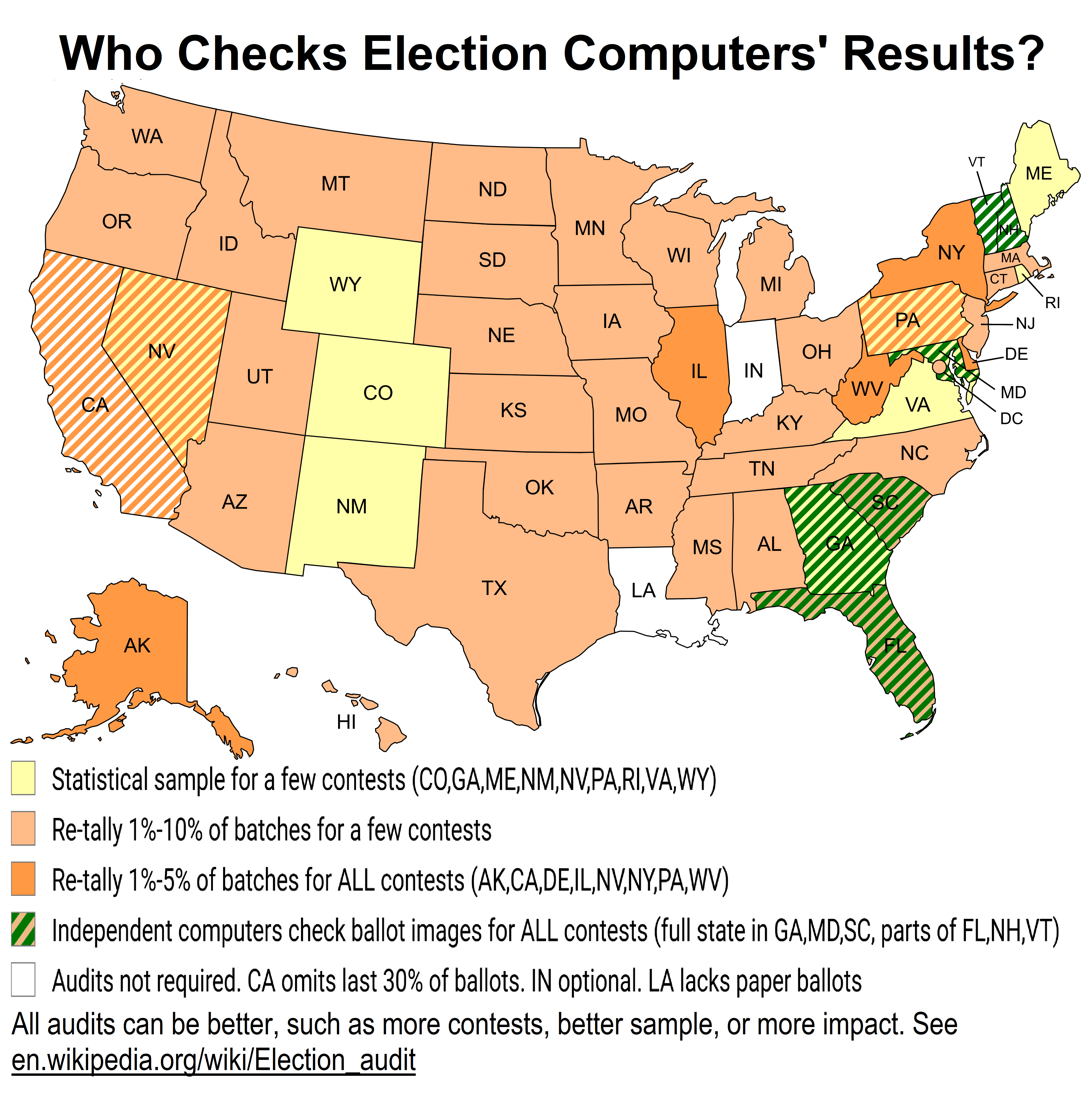
Most States Check Computer Counts Only on a Few Contests

Only three US states and parts of three other states audit all contests on all ballots, to have an independent check whether all large and small contests were counted accurately. GA, MD and SC hire a company to re-analyze scans of the ballots. The scans were made by the original election equipment, so the audits have a risk of inaccurate scans. In FL, NH and VT, all ballots are rescanned and reanalyzed in some counties or towns. In these three states, ballots are stored at least briefly before rescanning, so they have a risk that ballots could be altered in storage.

Eight states do not require audits. This number includes IN, KY, OK where audits are optional, LA which has an audit law but lacks paper ballots, and AL, ME, MS, ND, which have no audit laws.

Other states check paper ballots which have been in storage until the audit for days or weeks, so they have a risk of ballots altered in storage. Two US states hand-tally a representative sample of stored ballots, tally all contests on those ballots, and make corrections in official results if needed: PA and WV. Two more states hand-tally all contests on a representative sample of all ballots, so they can check official results, though not necessarily correcting them if that were needed: DE, UT. In PA, UT and WV sample sizes are usually adequate for state-wide contests, but not for close county and local results. All state assembly districts and local governments have a chance of being covered and audited, and they also have a chance of being missed entirely by these random samples of precincts and election machines.

NY checks if election machines performed as expected, not whether they captured voter intent, so circles and checkmarks outside target areas are not checked by the audit. Two other states hand-tally all contests, but the samples exclude significant groups of ballots: AK excludes small precincts; CA excludes ballots processed after election night (a third). (Note: In 2018 California law changed to audit only ballots in the Semifinal Official Canvass, which covers election night. They exclude ballots arriving in the mail after election day, and counties may also exclude any of the earlier mailed and provisional ballots which they do not have time to count by election night. News story on the law, and the law itself, are below. Semifinal Official Canvass included 63% of ballots 11/8/2024, 69% 11/3/2020, and 57% of ballots 3/3/2020. In 2020 each county could choose to audit one or more within-county contests on a statistical sample of all ballots, but would still need 1% tally of all other contests, and that statistical approach has expired. (ELEC 15365 - 15367): News story: Steinberg, Sean (2017-10-30). "New California Law Strikes Blow to Election Audits - WhoWhatWhy". WhoWhatWhy.; Law: "Bill Text - AB-840 Elections: vote by mail and provisional ballots". leginfo.legislature.ca.gov. 2017-10-15.; Definition of Semifinal Official Canvass: "California Elections Code 353.5". leginfo.legislature.ca.gov. 2008-01-01.; Ballot count SF-semifinal, day after 11/4/25 general: 7,434,841 https://web.archive.org/web/*/https://electionresults.sos.ca.gov/returns/status; Ballot count at end of 2025 statewide election 11,584,393 https://elections.cdn.sos.ca.gov/sov/2025-special/sov/03-voter-participation-stats-by-county.pdf; Ballot count day after 11/5/24 general: 10,185,583 https://web.archive.org/web/20241213000000*/https://electionresults.sos.ca.gov/returns/status; Ballot count at end of 2024 general: 16,140,044 https://admin.cdn.sos.ca.gov/elections/sov/2024-general/sov/03-voter-participation-stats-by-county.pdf; 2024 counts by county: https://commons.wikimedia.org/wiki/File:California_Election_Audit.png; Ballot count day after 11/3/20 general: 12,296,360 https://web.archive.org/web/20201105171748/https://electionresults.sos.ca.gov/returns/status; Ballot count at end of 2020 general:17,783,784 https://web.archive.org/web/20210110095403/https://electionresults.sos.ca.gov/returns/status; Ballot count day after 3/3/20 primary: 5,518,805 https://web.archive.org/web/20200305070323/https://electionresults.sos.ca.gov/returns/status; Ballot count at end of 2020 primary: 9,687,076 https://web.archive.org/web/20200424171200/https://electionresults.sos.ca.gov/returns/status; Handtally reports through 2010: "County 1% Manual Tally Reports". California Secretary of State. Archived from the original on 2019-07-31.) For the two thirds of ballots audited, California does ensure that all contests are covered; they add precincts or machines to the initial sample, to ensure they sample at least some ballots from every contest. Most of the other states check only a few contests, so errors are not measured in most contests.

Considering the recommended best practices above, two states (DC, MA) allow public observation of all steps; several states (MD, NH, NM, RI, SC, VT) have audits done or contracted by the Secretary of State, which is partly independent of election day procedures; 18 states hand-count; six states (CO, MD, NC, NM, RI, VA) have good samples for statistical confidence; no states have ways to recover from discrepancies in the chain of custody; other issues are listed in the table below.

Computerization of elections occurred rapidly in the United States following the presidential election of 2000, in which imprecise vote-counting practices played a controversial role, and the subsequent adoption of the Help America Vote Act (HAVA) of 2002. The rapid switch to computerized vote tabulation forced election officials to abandon many pre-automation practices that had been used to verify vote totals, such as the redundancy included in valid hand-counting procedures.

=== Table of U.S. audit rules ===
List of Election Audit Practices in the US
State	Number of Contests Audited	Sample Size	Which Units Are Sampled?	Excluded from Audits	Method of Auditing Ballots	Do Audits Revise Election Outcomes?	Deadline, days after election day	Level of Discrepancy to Trigger Action	Action if Discrepancy	State Gets Report?	Law	Rules	2020 Population (Millions)
California	All (sample expands to cover contests not found in initial sample)	1% plus enough extra to cover all contests. Local elections official may select more than 1%	batches or precincts (RLA law expired 1/1/2023)	Ballots tallied after election night (1/3 of ballots)	Hand tally	No	Before finalize	No rules	Report	Yes	Cal. Elec. Code §336.5, §15360 RLA: §15365-15367	1%: 2 CCR 7-4.5 to 4.7. RLA: 2 CCR 7-2	40
Texas	6-Sec of State chooses 3 races & 3 ballot items	at least 1% or 3	precincts	0.6% of in-person lack paper ballots	Hand tally	Maybe	21	Any	Try to determine cause	Yes	Tex. Elec. Code Ann. §127.201 (Vernon 2015)	Election Advisory No. 2012-03	29
Florida	All by machine, or 1 contest by hand, randomly chosen by each county	20%-100% by machine or 2% by hand	precincts	Optional if any manual recount done	Tally with machines different from voting system or by hand	No	Before finalize	No rules	Report	Yes	Fla. Stat. Ann. §101.591	Procedures Manual and rule 1S-5.026	22
New York	All contests on sampled machines or in sampled precincts (districts)	3%	for election day: sample of precinct machines; for early votes: sample of memory devices; for centrally counted ballots: sample of precincts	none	Use machines different from voting system, or manual count to check if voting system performed as programmed Court may order manual instead of machine	Yes	15	expand sample if 10% of machines differ at all from their audit count, or any candidate count differs by 0.1% of the audit sample. Report any anomaly.	Expand sample in stages to full recount, except a partisan commissioner may decide not to if they think it won't affect outcome.	Yes	N.Y. Election Law §9-211 and §16-113	9 N.Y. Comp. Rules & Regs. 6210.18 and 6210.20	20
Pennsylvania	All contests in sampled precincts	lesser of 2% or 2,000 ballots.	2% by precincts or batches	none	Hand tally	Yes	Before finalize	No rules. "RLA" is batch comparison without expansion, so not risk-limiting.		No	Pa. Cons. Stat. tit. 25 §3031.17, §2650, and Stein settlement	Directives: Electronic Voting Systems & RLAs	13
Illinois	All contests in samples	5%	precincts & machines	none	Tally with machines the optical ballots, (Note: 10ILCS5/24B-15 "in those jurisdictions where in-precinct counting equipment is used, the election authority shall retabulate the total number of votes cast in 5% of the precincts within the election jurisdiction, as well as 5% of the voting devices used in early voting.") which are common, others by hand or different machine from election	No	Before finalize	Any	Report	Yes	Il. Rev. Stat. ch. 10 §5/24A-15, 10 §5/24C-15		12.8
Ohio	3-President or Governor, random state-wide, random county-wide	at least 5% of votes	machines, precincts or polling places	odd-numbered years	Hand tally	Yes	Before finalize	0.5% (0.2% if winning margin under 1%)	Expand sample. Sec of State may order full recount of county	Yes	R.C. 3505-331	Secretary of State Directive 2019-30, 2014-36,[3] 2015 Election Official Manual, settlement agreement LWV Ohio v. Brunner	11.8
Georgia	All on images. RLA: 1-chosen by SOS, nonrandom	100% of images, plus risk-limiting.	ballots	elections without statewide or federal offices	Image audit & Hand tally	Yes	Before finalize	Statistical cutoffs	Investigate & decide	Yes	OCGA 21-2-498.1 and OCGA 21-2-498	Images and SEB Rule 183-1-15-.04	10.7
North Carolina	1-President or state-wide ballot item	statistician decides	precincts	none	Hand tally	Yes	Before finalize	Significant	Expand sample to whole county, all races	No	N.C. Gen. Stat. Ann. §163-182.1		10.4
Michigan	1-statewide	5%	precincts	none	Hand tally	No	After finalize	No action	Training	Yes	MCLA §168.31a	Post-Election Audit Manual	10.1
New Jersey	All federal & state offices. Sec.of State picks county & municipal contests. No schools, fire districts, or ballot measures.	Procedures say 2%. Law says enough for 99% confidence on federal & state-wide; 90% on state contests; 90% on county & muni with 100+ precincts; 2 precincts for smaller county & muni	Precincts ("election districts") for election-day in-person. For others: batches sorted by ballot style.	8.7% of in-person lack paper ballots	Hand tally of paper ballots	Yes	Before certification	0.1%	Double sample. More if likely to correct outcome	Yes	N.J. Stat. Ann. 19:61-9	New Jersey Election Audit Procedure – General Election 2022, 2023	9.3
Virginia	2-President & Senator, or others selected by Sec of State	risk-limiting	machines in at least random fifth of localities (all in 2020)	Primaries	Hand tally	No	After finalize	Any	Analyze	Yes	Code of VA 24.2-671.1		8.6
Washington	1-any contest on batches or precincts, 2 in RLA, or 3 on in-person machines	In most counties: 6 batches. Or county could choose 3 precincts, or 4% of in-person machines (rarely-used in all-mail state, or RLA	batches, machines, or precincts	none	Hand tally or machines different from the election machines	Maybe	Before finalize	Any	investigate & resolve	Yes	Wash. Rev. Code Ann. §29A.60.185, §29A.60.170, 434-262-105		7.7
Arizona	5-President, random federal, random state-wide, random legislative, ballot measure	Election-day: 2% or at least 2 precincts. Early & mail: 1% or at most 5,000 ballots	Election-day: precincts. Early & mail ballots sampled by batches	Provisionals and counties where a party refuses	Hand tally	Yes	Before finalize	Statistical committee chooses cutoffs	Expand sample, up to whole county, for affected office	Yes	Ariz. Rev. Stat. §16-602	AZ Elections Procedures Manual	7.2
Massachusetts	6-President, state and national Senator and Representative, random ballot question	3%	precincts	Primaries & non-Presidential years	Hand tally	Maybe	14	Cast doubt on outcome	Sec of State may expand audit	Yes	Mass. Gen. Law Ann. ch. 54 § 109A		7.0
Tennessee	1-President or Governor	1 to 5	precincts	VVPAT and special elections not in Aug or Nov	different optical scanner; if the 2 scanners differ >1%, hand count	No	Begins day after election day	1%	Expand sample to 3% of precincts. Then no action, but audit is evidence in court	No	Tenn. Code Ann. § 2-20-103		6.9
Indiana	All contests in sample	up to 5% or 5	precincts		If requested by a party chair in county, hand tally paper ballots or use machine different from voting system	Yes	12	No rules	Correct errors	No	Indiana Code §3-12-3.5-8, 3-12-13, 3-12-14		6.8
Maryland	All on images. 1-nonrandom statewide by hand	100% of images and statistical sample by hand	All images. Statistical sample of ballots or batches	No images are excluded. RLA excludes primaries	Independent machines re-tally all ballot images from election machines. Hand enter RLA into software	Yes	Before finalize	Any	Investigate and resolve	Yes	MD Elec. Law §11-309	Code of Md. Regs. §33.08.00 to 10	6.18
Missouri	5-state-wide candidate & ballot issue, legislator, judicial, county	5%	precincts	none	Hand tally	Maybe	Before finalize	0.50%	Investigate and resolve	Yes		15 Mo. Code of State Regs. §30-10.110	6.15
Wisconsin	4-President or Governor, and 3 random state contests	5%	wards or other districts reporting results	Primaries and early, absentee, provisional	Hand tally	No	Before finalize	Any	If no explanation, get manufacturer to investigate	Yes	Wis. Stat. Ann. §7.08(6)	WI Elections Com'n Voting Equipment Audits, 2018	5.9
Colorado	All contests on sampled ballots are checked, but sample is only designed and reported for statewide contests and 1 in each county (in primary: 1/party/county) non-randomly chosen by Sec of State	risk-limiting based on target contests, so may be too few for other contests	ballots	none	Hand-compare ballots to computer records, and SOS tally of computer records	Maybe	Before finalize	Statistical cutoffs	100% hand tally of whichever of the 2 target contests has errors, not others	Yes	Colo. Rev. Stat. §1-7-515	CO SOS Election Rule 25	5.8
Minnesota	2-3-Governor & federal	3% or at least 2-4	precincts	none	Hand tally	Yes	Before finalize	0.5% or 2 votes	Expand samples for Governor & federal up to whole county, and if counties with 10% of state's ballots discover problems in a race, hand-count affected race statewide	Yes	Minn. Stat. Ann. §206.89		5.7
South Carolina	All on images. 1-4 per county by hand, chosen by state & local staff	100% on images. For each contest hand-counted in a county: 1 precinct	All images. Some precincts	Unknown	Independent machines re-tally all ballot images from election machines. Hand tally some	Probably	Before certification	0.5%	Explain or audit more	Yes	SC law 7-3-20(D)(19)	SC Election Commission website	5.1
Alabama	1 or more nonrandom federal or state contests chosen by each county	1 or more nonrandom chosen by county	precinct	primaries, special, sub-county, absentee, provisional	30 ballots by hand, others by hand or machine	No	Sample 10 days. Start 31 days. End 61 days.	None	None	Yes	Act No. 2026–433		5.0
Louisiana	0-voters lack paper trail	not in law	not in law	not in law	not in law	Not in law	Not in law	No rules	No rules	No rules	R.S. 18:1353(C)(5)		4.7
Kentucky	1 random	1 random ballot scanner. Also process & eligibility audits in 6 counties by AG	ballot scanner	none?	hand tally	Report to AG	Before finalize	No rules	No rules	Yes	Ky. Rev. Stat. §117.305, §117.383(7), §117.275(9), §15.243(3)	31 Ky. Admin. Regs. 4:230	4.5
Oregon	2-3: 1 heaviest vote in each county, 1 statewide office & 1 ballot measure. Or RLA of 1 single-county contest or 1 multi-county jointly with other counties	3% to 10% depending on margin of victory	precincts (at least 1 over 150 ballots) or batches, random selection by SOS	Small precincts in small counties which only sample 1 precinct	Hand tally, except small precincts	Yes in counties with discrepancies	Before finalize	0.50%	Expand sample to whole county for that vote tally system, all races	Yes	ORS §254.529, §254-532, §254-535	OAR 165-007-0290, 165-007-0450, Other audits forbidden	4.2
Oklahoma	1 or more chosen by Secretary of State Election Board	1 or more per county chosen by Secretary of State Election Board	precincts	none?	manual or machine	no	none	none	none	yes	OK Stat § 26-3-130.		4.0
Connecticut	3 when President or Governor on ballot, including 1 random; 20% of races in primaries and municipal ballots	5%	voting districts	Early, absentee, provisional	Tally with machines or by hand	Maybe	Before finalize	0.50%	Investigate and if needed recount county with mix of hand and machine counts	Yes	Conn. Gen. Stat. §9-320f		3.6
Utah	Primary: all contests on sample ballots. General:Top federal or Governor, 1 state legislator, 1 county-wide, 1 ballot measure, any contest <5% margin	Batches with at least 50 ballots per scanner, lesser of 1% or 1,000 ballots, at least 1 batch per scanner	batches	Ballots arriving more than 2 days after election day. Odd-numbered years	Compare ballot, its image, scanner interpretation (CVR)	Not in law	Start on 6th day, end by canvass	No rules	No rules	Yes	UT Code Ann. §36-12-15.2	State of Utah Election Audit Policy	3.27
Iowa	1-President or Governor	1 precinct per county	precincts	none	Hand tally	No	After canvass	No rules	Report	Yes	I,C,A, §50.51, HB 516, enacted in 2017		3.19
Nevada	RLA: 1 statewide, 1 countywide, both random.	Statistical sample of ballots. County also checcks 1 ballot each from greater of 4 or 3% of electronic voting machines (20 or 2% in counties over 100,000 population)	machines & ballots	Machine sample excludes absentee & provisional. RLA excludes special elections	Tally with machines or by hand	No	Results from sample of machines 7 days after election. RLA no deadline	Sample of machines: 4 votes. RLA: statistics	Expand sample	Yes	Nev. Rev. Stat. §293.247, SB123(2019), 293.394	Nev. Admin. Code 293.255, 293.480 to 485 and Elections Procedures Manual	3.10
Arkansas	1-random county-wide	15 counties	tabulation machines, precincts, entire counties	special elections	Hand tally	No	60	No rules	No rules	Public	AR Code §7-4-101, §7-4-121 §7-5-702 and uncodified section 5 in Act 888		3.01
Mississippi	Not specified, chosen by SOS	3 months before election randomly choose 1 county per Congressional District and up to lesser of 5 precincts per county or 25%	precincts	primaries, special	unknown	no	after certification. Submit report by 4 months after election	none	none	yes. state does report	Mississippi Code Section 23-15-615		2.96
Kansas	3-4+: 1 each random: federal, statewide, state legislative, county. And all federal, statewide & legislative races closer than 1%	1%	precincts	ballots counted after election night	Hand tally	Yes	Before finalize	No rules	resolve or expand		KSA 25.3009	KAR 7-47-1	2.94
New Mexico	6-7-federal, governor, closest statewide, 3 closest local	None in race with over 15% margin of victory, otherwise enough for 90% confidence, except local elections use number of precincts from previous general election (Note: "The calculations for determining the number of precincts in the sample assume that the maximum margin shift in any precinct will not exceed thirty percent. Achieving the ninety percent probability of detection with the number of precincts in the sample as indicated in Table 1 requires that the probability of selecting a precinct is proportional to the precinct size.")	precincts, at least 1 per county	multi-county legislative, races with automatic recount	Hand tally	Yes	Before finalize	error over 90% of the margin of victory	Expand sample, up to whole state for affected office	Yes	N.M. Stat. Ann. §1-14-13.2 et seq.	NMAC 1.10.23.9	2.12
Nebraska	3-nonrandom, 1 each federal, state, local	2-2.5%	precincts	Elections which are not state-wide	Hand tally	No	After final adjournment of county canvass bd, & by 5 weeks after election day		Report	Yes		Nebraska Election Security	1.96
West Virginia	All contests in sampled precincts	3%	precincts	none	Hand tally	Yes	Before finalize	1% or changed outcome	Expand sample to whole county, all races	No	W. Va. Code, §3-4A-28	2020 Best Practices Guide for Canvass	1.84
Idaho	SOS choice among federal, governor, closest statewide office & issue. Can vary in each precinct & batch)	5% of random 8 counties of the 44	5% of precincts (or more to get 2,100 ballots) and random batches of early & mail ballots with as many such ballots as the sample precincts	odd years	Hand Tally	Probably	Before state verifies final results	Any	SOS may order more audits for problems found	Yes	Idaho Code §34-1203A	SOS Directive	1.79
Hawaii	3-state-wide, county-wide, district-wide	10%	precincts (10% of 42 in Hawaii county, 36 in Maui, 16 in Kauai, 154 in Honolulu)	none	Hand tally of ballot images	Yes	Before finalize	Any	Expand audit until staff are satisfied with results	Yes	Hawaii Rev. Stat. §16-42	Haw. Admin. Rules § 3-172-102	1.46
New Hampshire	All contests in sample	2 towns or city wards	towns or city wards	All other places	Rescan, tally, and compare 5% of new images to new interpretations	No	3 days after election day	None	None	Yes	SB366 (2022)		1.38
Maine	SOS may choose among federal & state contests	Statistical	ballots	none	manual	yes	none	statistical	correct the certified outcome	yes. done by state	Me. Stat. tit. 21-A, § 726.		1.36
Rhode Island	Some, nonrandom	risk-limiting	Precinct, batch or ballot	none	Hand tally	Yes	Before finalize	Statistical cutoffs	Expand sample to full recount	Yes	R.I. Stat. Ann. §17-19-37.4		1.10
Montana	8-2 federal, 2 state-wide, 2 legislative, 2 ballot measure	at least 10% or 2	precincts	overvotes, undervotes, non-scannable ballots, judicial retention, entire county if any race close enough for free recount or hand-counted	Hand tally	Yes in precincts audited	Before finalize	0.5% or 5 votes	Expand sample but not full recount except in small counties with up to 7 precincts. Check machines with errors	Yes	Mont. Code Ann. §13-17-501- §13-17-509		1.08
Delaware	All contests on half of sample, 1 statewide contest on half of sample	2 machines per county, 3 districts in Wilmington	machines and districts	none	Hand tally	No	After finalize	0.50%	further tests of same machine, sometimes another	Yes	Del. Code. Title 15 §5012A		0.99
South Dakota	2 random, including 1 statewide	5%, with at least 100 ballots	precincts	special elections and elections with any recount	hand count	not directly	within 15 days after state canvass	more than margin of victory	tell candidates in audited contests, who can ask for recount	yes	12-17B		0.89
North Dakota	4: 1 federal, 1 statewide, 1 legislative, 1 county	1 polling place per county	polling places	elections which are not statewide	"review the ballots"	SOS may ask for more audits in county, to correct results	8	any	SOS may ask for more audits in county, to correct results	yes	N.D. Cent. Code 16.1-06-15		0.78
Alaska	All contests in sample precincts	1 per House district, with at least 5% of district ballots, so about 600 registered voters	large precincts	Small precincts	Hand tally	Yes	Before finalize	1%	Expand sample to whole district (1/40th of state), all races	Yes	Alaska Stat. §15.15.420, §15.15.430, §15.15.440, §15.15.450, §15.10.170		0.73
District of Columbia	4-random District-wide, 2-ward-wide, 1 any type	5%	precincts & ballots	none	Hand tally	Yes	Before finalize	0.25% or 20% of margin of victory	Expand sample, up to whole county, for affected office	Yes	D.C. Code Ann. §1-1001.09a		0.69
Vermont	All in 6 towns	All in 6 towns randomly picked by Sec of State	polling places	All but 6 towns	Re-scan & machine-tally, except hand tally ballots which were hand tallied on election day.	No	30	Any	Investigate	Yes	17 Vt. Stat. Ann. §2493, §2581 - §2588		0.64
Wyoming	6 statewide contests. County has option to do more	statistical up to 5% max	Ballots	None	Compare ballot image to CVR	Not in law	1 day before state canvass board meets	Not in law	Not in law	Yes	W.S. 22–6-130	WY Admin. Rules SOS Election Procedures Chapter 25 and Statewide Election Audit Policy for 2022	0.58

Other state variations. Only DC requires that observers be able to see ballots being audited well enough to discern voter's marks. Three states have rules for what happens when stored ballots are missing: CO-Missing ballots are treated as being cast for all the losers in risk level calculations; MI and NC-no audit.

=== Risk-limiting audits ===
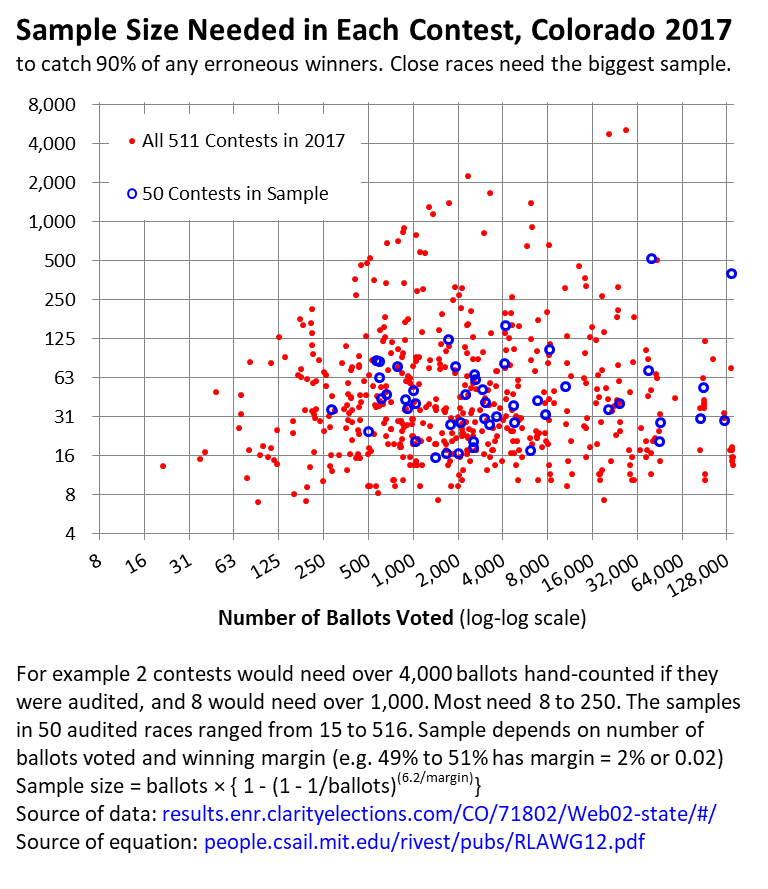
Colorado elections in 2017, sample sizes needed for risk-limiting audits

Risk-limiting audits are required in Colorado, North Carolina, Rhode Island and Virginia. These store voting machines' interpretation of each ballot (cast vote record), collect them centrally over the internet, re-tally them with an independent computer to check totals, and hand-check a sample of the stored paper ballots to check voting machines' interpretations. Samples are big enough to be sure results are accurate, up to an acceptable level of risk, such as 9%. For each audited contest, if the original computer interpretations identified the wrong winner, there is a 9% chance in Colorado that the audit will miss it, and the wrong winner will take office. A lower risk limit would let fewer errors through, but would require larger sample sizes. Close contests also require larger sample sizes. Colorado audits only a few contests, and audits none of the closest contests, which need the biggest samples. Auditing all contests would require several counties to hand-count thousands of ballots each.

If the samples do not confirm the initial results, more rounds of sampling may be done, but if it appears the initial results are wrong, risk-limiting audits require a 100% hand count to change the result, even if that involves hand-counting hundreds of thousands of ballots.

Colorado notes that they have to be extremely careful to keep ballots in order, or they have to number them, to be sure of comparing the hand counts with the machine records of those exact ballots. Colorado says it has a reliable system to re-tally the records, but it is not yet publicly documented.

In 2010, the American Statistical Association endorsed risk-limiting audits, to verify election outcomes. With use of statistical sampling to eliminate the need to count all the ballots, this method enables efficient, valid confirmation of the outcome (the winning candidates). In 2011, the federal Election Assistance Commission initiated grants for pilot projects to test and demonstrate the method in actual elections. In 2014, the Presidential Commission on Election Administration recommended the method for use in all jurisdictions following all elections, to reduce the risk of having election outcomes determined by undetected computer error or fraud. In 2017, Colorado became the first state to implement risk-limiting audits statewide as a routine practice during the post-election process of certifying election results.

=== Ballot scans for 100% audits ===
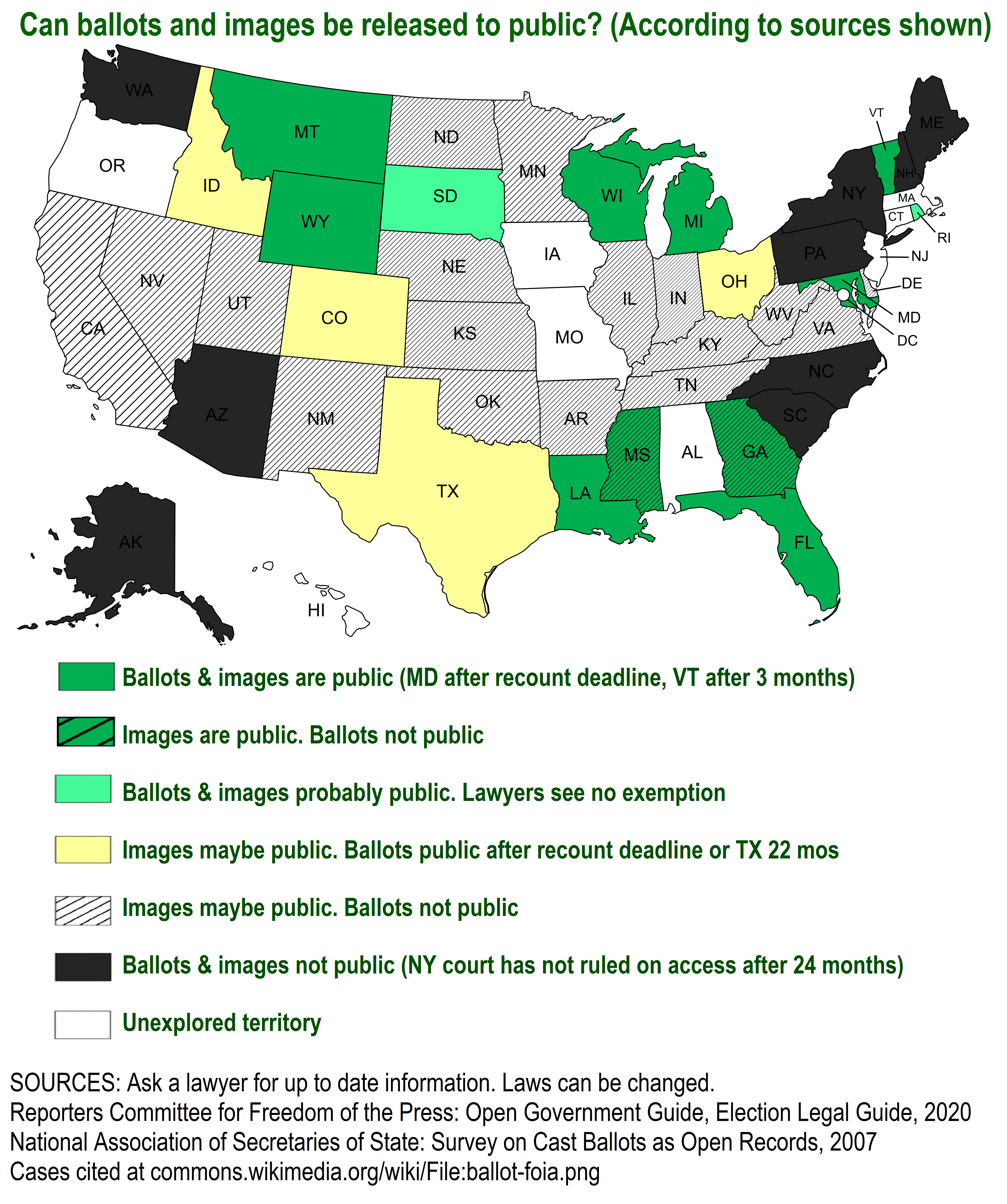
Ballots or scanned images available to public for independent audits

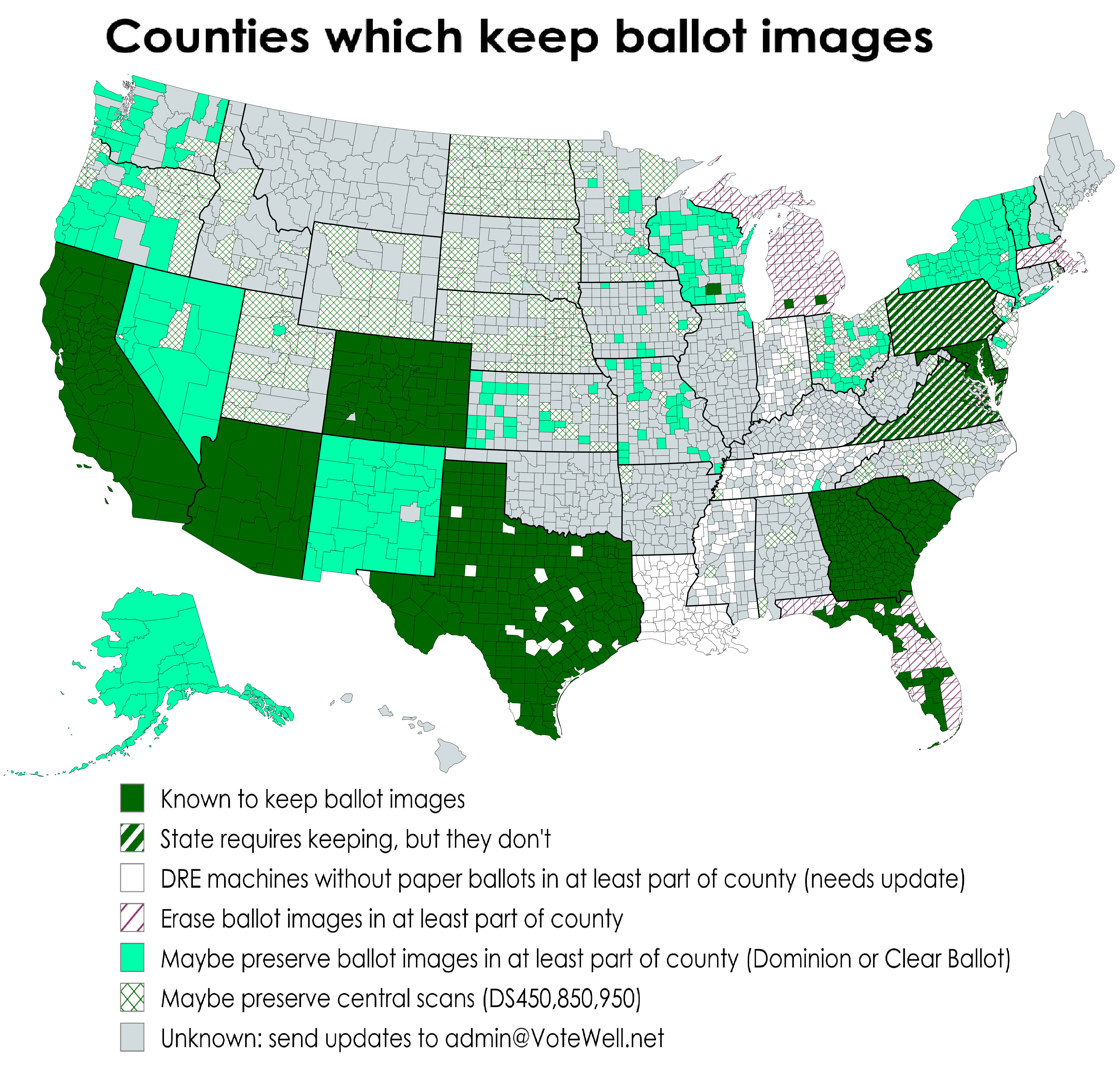
Ballot mages saved by election scanners

Humboldt County Elections Transparency Project, Clear Ballot, and TrueBallot scan all ballots with a commercial scanner, so extensive audits can be done on the scans without damaging paper ballots, without hand-counting, by multiple groups, independently of the election software. Clear Ballot is certified by the US Election Assistance Commission for voting, and they also have an auditing system, ClearAudit. TrueBallot does not currently serve government elections, just private groups. Both use proprietary software, so if it were hacked at the vendor or locally to create false images of the ballots or false counts, then local officials and the public could not check it.

The "Brakey method" is an approach using electronic ballot images already created by most current US election systems. These ballot images could be hacked if the election software itself is hacked, either at the vendor or elsewhere, so for full security, ballot images need to be checked against the paper ballots, to determine if the images are accurate. To enable this one to one ballot-image comparison, the Brakey Method requires that the ballot images be linkable to their paper ballots, either by keeping paper ballots in the same order as the scans, or through a unique identifier that appears on both digital image and physical ballot.

Independent systems to tally ballot images include Audit Engine, Free and Fair, OSET Institute (under development), and the Elections Transparency Project, as used in Humboldt County, California, a medium-sized county with 58,000 ballots in the 2016 general election.

Humboldt uses a commercial scanner to scan all ballots and puts them in a digitally signed file, so true copies of the file can be reliably identified. Ballots with identifying marks are first hand-copied by election staff, to anonymize them, since they are valid under California law. The scanner prints a number on each ballot before scanning it, so the scan can be checked against the same physical ballot later if needed. The project has written open source software (Trachtenburg Election Verification Software, TEVS) to read the files, and they check all contests on all ballots to see if official counts are correct. The first time they scanned and checked, in 2008, they found 200 missing ballots, showing the value of complete checks. Other jurisdictions can similarly scan ballots and use Humboldt's software or their own to audit all contests. They need to ensure their in-house counting software is secure and independent of any bugs or hacks in the election software, just as users of risk-limiting audits do.

Reading these scans, with software independent of the election system, is a practical way to audit a large number of close contests, without large hand counts. Scans are also the only practical way to bypass problems of physical security, if paper ballots are scanned, digitally signed, and the resulting electronic records are verified against a sample of paper ballots, as ballots arrive. Scans can be made and digitally signed before ballots are stored, while other audit methods are too slow to do election night. Scanners can process thousands of ballots per hour, and several scanners can operate simultaneously in larger jurisdictions. Once ballots are scanned and a digital signature is published, electronic records can be tallied at any convenient time.

Humboldt and several other jurisdictions have gone beyond this internal approach, and release the digitally signed files of ballot images to the public, so others can use their own software, independent of the election system and officials, to check all contests on all ballots. Public release lets losing candidates who mistrust the election officials' security measures do their own checks. Humboldt County believes the scans give their citizens high confidence in the county election results.

=== Recounts ===
Recounts may be considered to be a specific type of audit, but not all audits are recounts. The Verified Voting Foundation explains the difference between audits and recounts: Post-election audits are performed to “routinely check voting system performance…not to challenge to the results, regardless of how close margins of victory appear to be", while "recounts repeat ballot counting (and are performed only) in special circumstances, such as when preliminary results show a close margin of victory. Post-election audits that detect errors can lead to a full recount.” In the US, recount laws vary by state, but typically require recounting 100% of the votes, while audits may use samples. Recounts incorporate elements of both results and process audits.

=== Other variations ===
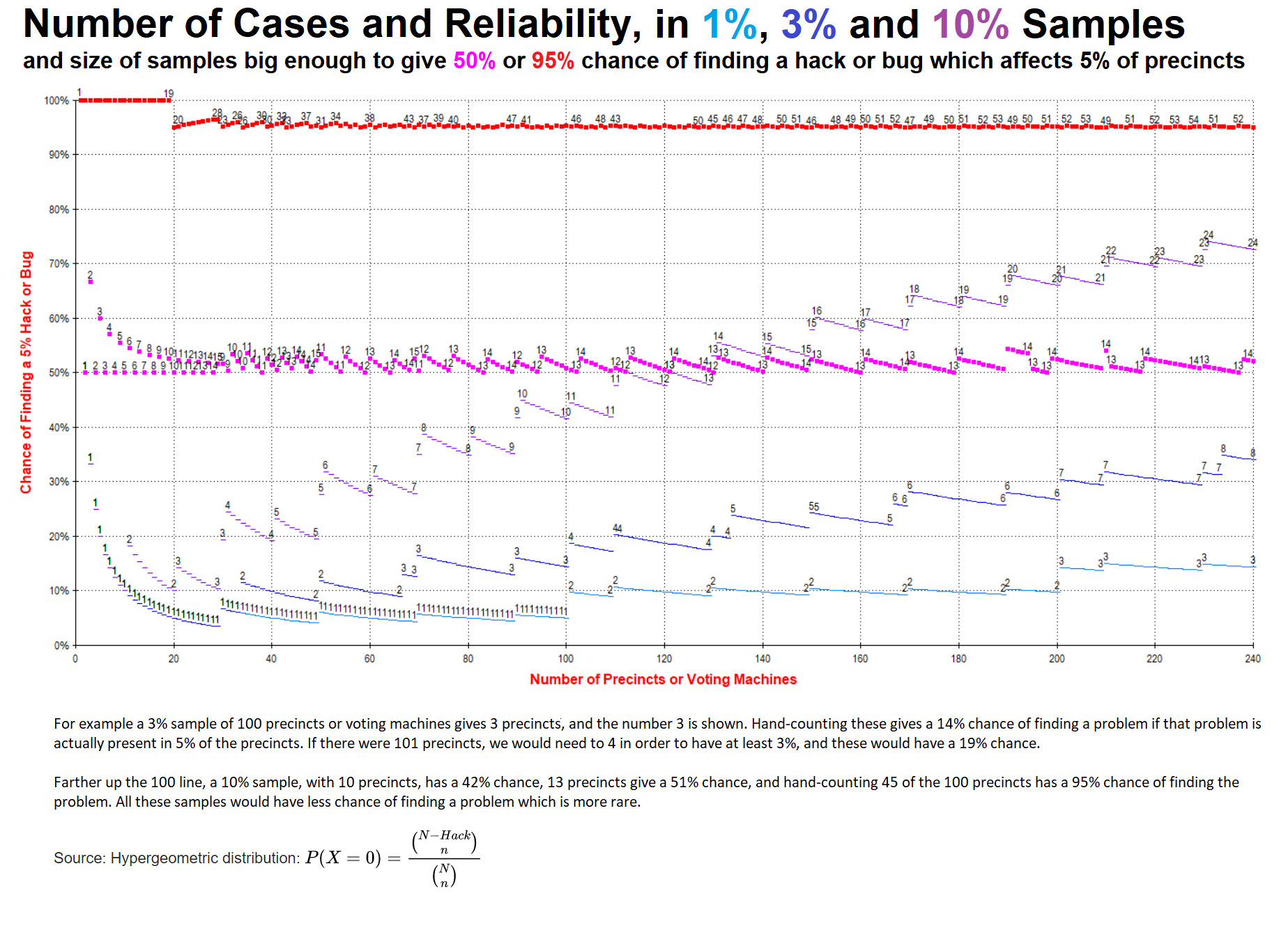
Samples used for election audits

Hand and machine counts. Current audits in most states involve counting paper ballots by hand, but some states re-use the same machines used in the election. Three states use different machines, to provide some independent check.

Sample sizes. When states audit, they usually pick a random sample of 1% to 10% of precincts to recount by hand or by machine. If a precinct has more than one machine, and they keep ballots and totals separate by machine, they can draw a sample of machines rather than precincts and count all ballots processed by that machine. These samples can identify systematic errors widely present in the election. They have only a small chance of catching a hack or bug which was limited to a few precincts or machines, even though that could change the result in close contests.

Number of contests. In the random sample, most states audit only a few contests, so they can only find problems in those contests.

== Ballot transport and storage ==
Paper ballots and computer files need to be kept securely in case they are needed for recounts, audits or protests. North Carolina specifies that no audit is done if ballots are missing or damaged. Ballots are at risk when being transported from drop boxes and polling places to central locations, and may be protected by GPS tracking, guards, security systems, (Note: Truckers have developed high security systems for valuable shipments.) and/or a convoy of the public. (Note: Experts recommend letting different party members ride in the ballot transport vehicle, letting other observers accompany the vehicle, and using guards when needed. Ballots have fallen from trucks during transport.)

Security recommendations include preventing access by anyone alone, which would typically require two hard-to-pick locks, and having keys held by independent officials if such officials exist in the jurisdiction; having storage risks identified by people other than those who design or manage the system; and using background checks on staff.

Insider threats and the difficulty of following all security procedures are usually under-appreciated, and most organizations do not want to learn their vulnerabilities. When a contractor found poor security at county buildings in Iowa, the state ordered no more testing of security.

=== Rules ===
No US state has adequate laws on physical security of the ballots, and few localities do. During transport ballots are not necessarily locked or accompanied by two people. Emergency evacuations can leave polling places and documents unattended.

=== Timing ===
Auditing in the US is done several days after the election, so paper ballots and computer files need to be stored securely. 2008 guidelines for audits included starting audits as soon as possible after the election. 2018 guidelines recommend waiting until all ballots are counted, which in the US means one or more weeks until provisional ballots are adjudicated. (Note: "Starting to audit only when all the audit units have already been counted is the most straightforward method.") A faster start for the audit makes it feasible for independent parties to guard storage sites. (Note: Organisation for Security and Cooperation in Europe (OSCE) policy calls for independent foreign officials to sleep with ballots, and allows parties to do so. Turkish opposition sleeping with ballots, Republicans guarded warehouse of voted ballots in 2000 in Florida and had state police lock up ballots in New Mexico.)

Physical security of stored paper ballots is particularly important between the time the random sample is selected and when the corresponding ballots are examined, to prevent adjusting the ballots to match erroneous electronic records. Neither Colorado nor California has any limit on how much time can pass. Michigan allows two weeks from the time the sample is identified to the time local election officials must audit them.

Britain, Canada, France, Germany, Spain and other countries count all ballots on election night, including final decisions on questionable ballots, so final counts happen before ballots go into storage. Canada and France sometimes use election machines with paper trails. In these cases risk-limiting audits could be done as soon as results are announced on election night.

=== Electronic backups ===
If audits cannot be done on election night, creating and verifying a paper or electronic backup of the paper ballots on election night, or the next day as in Florida, would provide an alternative benchmark if flaws are later discovered or suspected in the primary storage of paper ballots. Electronic copies in particular can be stored in safes or safe deposit boxes and/or distributed widely, with hash codes to ensure reliability.

=== Seals ===
Election storage often uses tamper-evident seals, although seals can typically be removed and reapplied without damage, especially in the first 48 hours. Photos taken when the seal is applied can be compared to photos taken when the seal is opened. Detecting subtle tampering requires substantial training. Election officials usually take too little time to examine seals, and the public is too far away to check seal numbers, though they could compare old and new photos projected on a screen. Seal numbers and photos would need their own secure storage.

When seals break, staff do not necessarily retest or replace the sealed items. Seals over USB ports came open on 13 scanners in Milwaukee in 2024.

Experienced testers can usually bypass all physical security systems. Locks (Note: Lockpicking is widely taught and practiced: Different techniques apply to electronic locks: There are no statistics on how often criminals enter rooms undetected, but law enforcement often does so, so ability to enter rooms undetected is widespread:) and cameras (Note: Security camera flaws have been covered extensively.) are vulnerable before and after delivery.

=== Keys ===
Since 1850, people have known how to create a master key from any key in a building, such as a borrowed restroom key. Attackers who cannot find key blanks can 3D-print them from a photo of the lock.

In the 2024 general election in Bedford County, PA, staff's keys could not open some tabulators. Other staff found ways to open them.

=== Sample breaches of election storage ===
Breaches of election security which have been identified, have primarily been done by insiders.

- 2017 Broward County, FL (Fort Lauderdale) elections staff erroneously destroyed paper ballots from an August 2016 primary. A court case was pending to gain access to them.
- 2017 In Georgia, elections were centrally programmed by Kennesaw State University. Four days after a lawsuit over election records was files, they erased the election records from their server. Later, the day after this case moved to federal court, they erased their backup.
- 2016 Clark County (Las Vegas), NV, Registrar of Voters opened ballot boxes in secret, did a secret recount before the public one, and hid the results. The Registrar said, "You're asking what my results were when we practiced? I can't tell you that.".
- 2010 Saguache County, CO Clerk and two judges hand-tallied ballots without public notice. They were discovered on security cameras.
- 2010 Detroit, MI, all 44,000 absentee ballots could not be recounted because seal numbers on bottom of containers did not match seal numbers recorded in election.
- 2007-2009 Cudahy, CA, city officials threw away, uncounted, ballots for candidates running against city council members.
- 2007 Cuyahoga County (Cleveland), OH election workers were convicted of going through locked ballots to ensure an audit would not find errors in the election. They testifiecf "that the board had always done things that way - with the knowledge of its attorney," .
- 2002-2007 Clay County, KY, election officials falsified election results and destroyed forms which showed they helped voters, since the voters they helped were being paid to vote certain ways.
- 1993 Philadelphia, PA, election board did not keep absentee ballots which had been rejected, from unregistered voters, and turned them over to the campaign which collected them.
