= VotingWorks =

Open-source election software and hardware nonprofit

- Formation: 2018
- Type: Nonprofit
- Headquarters: N/A (Virtual)
- Executive Director: Ben Adida
- Website: https://voting.works

VotingWorks is a nonprofit organization that creates and sells open-source voting systems in the U.S. It currently have three products: one for casting and counting ballots, another, named Arlo, for risk-limiting audits (RLAs), and a third for accessible at-home voting.

Spenser Mestel praised VotingWorks as helping to break up the monopoly of three voting systems owned by private equity firms and bring transparency and more security to the voting process. He also praised the organization for being transparent about its donors and criticized the private equity firms for not disclosing their investors.

== Organization ==
VotingWorks is a 501(c)3 founded in 2018. At the time, the next youngest election systems provider in the United States was 13 years older, with the second youngest being 40 years older. Ben Adida, who helped found the organization, holds a PhD from MIT in cryptography with a focus on elections and had previously worked as the Director of Engineering at Mozilla and Square. VotingWorks had a staff of 15 as of 2021.

== Adoption ==
In 2019, VotingWorks piloted its election systems for vote counting in the primary and general elections in Choctaw County, Mississippi, thanks in part to a favorable regulatory environment. Since then, other counties in Mississippi have signed-on and the state of New Hampshire has conducted a pilot, with other counties such as San Francisco looking to work with VotingWorks. New Hampshire's audit of its pilot found the software to be accurate, but the state has requested some hardware improvements. Officials in Mississippi have praised how easy it is to use.

Risk-limiting audits have also been performed using VotingWorks' other product, Arlo, in a few states including in Georgia.

VotingWorks systems in use
| | Vote Casting+Counting | Risk-Limiting Audit | Accessible Vote-by-mail |
|---|---|---|---|
| Illinois | | | ᚷ |
| Kentucky | | | ᚷ |
| Massachusetts | | | ᚷ |
| Mississippi | ᚷ* | | |
| New Hampshire | ᚷ* | | ᚷ |
| Georgia | | ᚷ | |
| Michigan | | ᚷ | |
| Pennsylvania | | ᚷ | |
| Rhode Island | | ᚷ | |
| Virginia | | ᚷ | |
| California | | ᚷ* | |
| Nevada | | ᚷ* | |
| New Jersey | | ᚷ* | ᚷ |
| North Carolina | | ᚷ* | |
| Washington | | ᚷ* | |

*select local jurisdictions (vs. statewide use)

== See also ==
- Civic technology
- Electoral fraud
