= Electoral fraud =

Illegal interference with the process of an election

Electoral fraud, also known as voter fraud, and sometimes referred to as election manipulation, election scam, vote hacking, vote rigging, or election stealing, is illegal interference with the process of an election, either by increasing the vote share of a favored candidate, depressing the vote share of rival candidates, or both. It differs from but often goes hand-in-hand with voter suppression. What exactly constitutes electoral fraud varies from country to country, though the goal is often election subversion.

Electoral legislation outlaws many kinds of election fraud, but other practices violate general laws, such as those banning assault, harassment or libel. Although technically the term "electoral fraud" covers only those acts which are illegal, the term is sometimes used to describe acts which are legal, but considered morally unacceptable, outside the spirit of an election or in violation of the principles of democracy. Sham elections, featuring only one candidate, are sometimes classified as electoral fraud, although they may comply with the law and are presented more as referendums/plebiscites.

In national elections, successful electoral fraud on a sufficient scale can have the effect of a coup d'état, protest, or corruption of democracy. In a narrow election, a small amount of fraud may suffice to change the result. Even if the outcome is not affected, the revelation of fraud can reduce voters' confidence in democracy.

== Law ==
Because U.S. states have primary responsibility for conducting elections, including federal elections, many forms of electoral fraud are prosecuted as state crimes. State election offenses include voter impersonation, double voting, ballot stuffing, tampering with voting machines, and fraudulent registration. Penalties vary widely by state and can include fines, imprisonment, loss of voting rights, and disqualification from holding public office.

The U.S. federal government prosecutes electoral crimes including voter intimidation, conspiracy to commit election fraud, bribery, interference with the right to vote, and fraud related to absentee ballots in federal elections.

In France, someone guilty may be fined and/or imprisoned for not more than one year, or two years if the person is a public official.

== Electorate manipulation ==
Electoral fraud can occur in advance of voting if the composition of the electorate is altered. The legality of this type of manipulation varies across jurisdictions. Deliberate manipulation of election outcomes is widely considered a violation of the principles of democracy.

=== Artificial migration or party membership ===
In many cases, it is possible for authorities to artificially control the composition of an electorate in order to produce a foregone result. One way of doing this is to move a large number of voters into the electorate prior to an election, for example by temporarily assigning them land or lodging them in flophouses. Many countries prevent this with rules stipulating that a voter must have lived in an electoral district for a minimum period (for example, six months) in order to be eligible to vote there. However, such laws can also be used for demographic manipulation as they tend to disenfranchise those with no fixed address, such as the homeless, travelers, Roma, students (studying full-time away from home), and some casual workers.

Another strategy is to permanently move people into an electoral district, usually through public housing. If people eligible for public housing are likely to vote for a particular party, then they can either be concentrated into one area, thus making their votes count for less, or moved into marginal seats, where they may tip the balance towards their preferred party. One example of this was the 1986–1990 Homes for votes scandal in the City of Westminster in England under Shirley Porter.

Immigration law may also be used to manipulate electoral demography. For instance, Malaysia gave citizenship to immigrants from the neighboring Philippines and Indonesia, together with suffrage, in order for a political party to "dominate" the state of Sabah; this controversial process was known as Project IC. In the United States, supporters of the far-right Great Replacement conspiracy theory claim that Democrats want to extend suffrage to undocumented immigrants to sway elections away from the Republicans.

A method of manipulating primary contests and other elections of party leaders are related to this. People who support one party may temporarily join another party (or vote in a crossover way, when permitted) in order to elect a weak candidate for that party's leadership. The goal ultimately is to defeat the weak candidate in the general election by the leader of the party that the voter truly supports. There were claims that this method was being utilised in the UK Labour Party leadership election in 2015, where Conservative-leaning Toby Young encouraged Conservatives to join Labour and vote for Jeremy Corbyn in order to "consign Labour to electoral oblivion". Shortly after, #ToriesForCorbyn trended on Twitter.

=== Disenfranchisement ===
The composition of an electorate may also be altered by disenfranchising some classes of people, making it very difficult or impossible for members of these classes to vote. Some U.S. states have enacted provisions that raised general barriers to voter registration, such as poll taxes, literacy and comprehension tests, and record-keeping requirements, which in practice were applied against minority populations to discriminatory effect. From 1900 through the 1960s, most African Americans in the southern states comprising the former Confederacy were disenfranchised by such measures. Corrupt election officials may misuse voting regulations, such as a literacy test or requirement for proof of identity or address, to make it difficult or impossible for their targets to cast a vote. If such practices discriminate against a religious or ethnic group, they distort the political process so greatly that the political order becomes grossly unrepresentative, as in the post-Reconstruction or Jim Crow era until the Voting Rights Act of 1965. Felons have been disenfranchised in many states as a strategy to prevent African Americans from voting.

Other groups can also be disenfranchised by certain electoral rules. For example, requiring people to vote within their electorate may disenfranchise active military personnel, prison inmates, students, hospital patients or anyone else who cannot easily appear in their home electorate. Polling can be held on inconvenient days, such as during the working week or on holy days for religious groups, like the Sabbath or other holy days of a religious group which teach that voting is prohibited on such a day. Communities may also be effectively disenfranchised if polling places are situated in areas perceived by voters as unsafe, or are not provided within reasonable proximity (rural communities are especially vulnerable to this).

In some cases, voters may be individually invalidly disenfranchised, which constitutes electoral fraud. A legitimate voter may be "accidentally" removed from the electoral roll, making it difficult or impossible for the person to vote.

Attempts at disenfranchisement tend to favor political groups currently in power. In the Canadian federal election of 1917, during the Great War, the government led by the Union Party passed the Military Voters Act and the Wartime Elections Act. The Military Voters Act permitted any active military personnel to vote only for a party (and not an individual candidate) and allowed that party to decide in which electoral district to place that vote. It also enfranchised those women who were directly related or married to an active soldier. These groups were believed to be disproportionately in favour of the Union government, who were campaigning in favor of conscription. The Wartime Elections Act, conversely, disenfranchised particular ethnic groups assumed to be disproportionately supportive of the opposition Liberal Party.

=== Division of opposition support ===
Stanford University professor Beatriz Magaloni described a model governing the behaviour of autocratic regimes. She proposed that ruling parties can maintain political control under a democratic system without actively manipulating votes or coercing the electorate. Under the right conditions, the democratic system is maneuvered into an equilibrium in which divided opposition parties act as unwitting accomplices to single-party rule. This allows the ruling regime to abstain from committing electoral fraud.

Preferential voting systems such as score voting and single transferable vote, and in some cases, instant-runoff voting, can reduce the impact of systemic electoral manipulation and political duopoly.

=== Intimidation ===
Voter intimidation involves putting undue pressure on a voter or group of voters so that they will vote a particular way, or will not vote at all. Absentee and other remote voting schemes can be more open to some forms of intimidation, as the voter does not have the protection and privacy of the polling location. Intimidation can take a range of forms including verbal, physical, or coercion. This was so common that in 1887, a Kansas Supreme Court in New Perspectives on Election Fraud in The Gilded Age said "[...] physical retaliation constituted only a slight disturbance and would not vitiate an election."

==== Violence or threats of violence ====
In its simplest form, voters from a particular demographic or known to support a particular party or candidate are directly threatened by supporters of another party or candidate, or another group hired to do so. For example, supporters of a particular party make it known that if a particular village or neighborhood is found to have voted the 'wrong' way, reprisals will be made against that community. Another method is to make a general threat of violence, for example, a bomb threat, which has the effect of closing a particular polling place, thus making it difficult for people in that area to vote. Polling places and areas may be targeted for vandalism, destruction, or threats thereof if they are known to support a particular party or candidate.

One notable example of actual violence was the 1984 Rajneeshee bioterror attack, where followers of Bhagwan Shree Rajneesh deliberately contaminated salad bars in The Dalles, Oregon, in an attempt to weaken political opposition during county elections. Historically, this tactic included lynching in the United States to intimidate potential African American voters in some areas.

==== Legal threats ====
Voters may be falsely told they are not legally entitled to vote, or that they are legally obliged to vote a particular way. Voters who are already not confident about their entitlement to vote may also be intimidated by real or implied authority figures who suggest that those who vote when they are not entitled to will be imprisoned, deported or otherwise punished.

==== Coercion ====
Employers can coerce a voter's decision, for example through explicit or implicit threats of job loss.

=== Disinformation ===
People may distribute false or misleading information in order to affect the outcome of an election. For example, in the Chilean presidential election of 1970, the U.S. Central Intelligence Agency used "black propaganda"—materials purporting to be from various political parties—to sow discord between members of a coalition to separate socialists and communists.

Another method, allegedly used in Cook County, Illinois, in 2004, is to falsely tell particular people that they are not eligible to vote In 1981, in New Jersey, the Republican National Committee created the Ballot Security Task Force to discourage voting among Latino and African-American citizens of New Jersey. The task force identified voters from an old registration list and challenged their credentials. It also paid off-duty police officers to patrol polling sites in Newark and Trenton, and posted signs saying that falsifying a ballot is a crime.

In 2004, in Wisconsin and elsewhere voters allegedly received flyers that said, "If you already voted in any election this year, you can't vote in the Presidential Election", implying that those who had voted in earlier primary elections were ineligible to vote. Also, "If anybody in your family has ever been found guilty of anything you can't vote in the Presidential Election." Finally, "If you violate any of these laws, you can get 10 years in prison and your children will be taken away from you."

Another use of disinformation is to give voters incorrect information about the time or place of polling, causing them to miss the actual opportunity to vote. As part of the 2011 Canadian federal election voter suppression scandal, Elections Canada discovered that a telecommunications company that worked with the Conservative Party falsely called voters, telling them their polling stations had been moved.

Similarly in the United States, right-wing political operatives Jacob Wohl and Jack Burkman were indicted on several counts of bribery and election fraud in October 2020 regarding a voter disinformation scheme they undertook in the months prior to the 2020 United States presidential election. The pair hired a firm to make nearly 85,000 robocalls that targeted minority neighborhoods in Pennsylvania, Ohio, New York, Michigan, and Illinois. Like Democratic constituencies in general that year, minorities voted overwhelmingly by absentee ballot, many judging it a safer option during the COVID-19 pandemic than in-person voting. The call falsely warned potential voters that if they submitted their votes by mail, authorities could use their personal information against them, including threats of police arrest for outstanding warrants and forced debt collection by creditors. On October 24, 2022, Wohl and Burkman pleaded guilty in Cuyahoga County, Ohio Common Pleas Court to one count each of felony telecommunications fraud. Commenting on the tactic of using disinformation to suppress voter turnout, Cuyahoga County Prosecutor Michael C. O'Malley said the two men had "infringed upon the right to vote", and that "by pleading guilty, they were held accountable for their un-American actions."

==== False claims of fraud ====
To sow election doubt, Donald Trump escalated use of "rigged election" and "election interference" statements in advance of the 2016, 2020 and 2024 elections.

Through early October 2026, Trump had attacked the integrity of US elections on more than 70% of the days following his 2025 inauguration, repeatedly making false claims.

False claims of electoral fraud can be used as a basis for attempting to overturn an election. During and after the 2020 presidential election, incumbent President Donald Trump made numerous allegations of electoral fraud by supporters of Democratic candidate Joe Biden. The Trump campaign lost numerous legal challenges to the results. President of Brazil Jair Bolsonaro also made numerous claims of electoral fraud without evidence during and after the 2022 Brazilian presidential election.

=== Dead people voting ===
Ballots can be fraudulently cast in the name of deceased individuals. While concerns about this type of electoral fraud often arise, studies suggest that actual cases are extremely rare. In many democratic systems, safeguards exist to prevent this, such as regularly updating voter rolls and requiring identification at polling stations. However, in some cases, fraudulent actors may exploit outdated records or present identification belonging to deceased individuals to attempt illegal voting.

In Indonesia, dead people voting occurred during the 2020 local elections and the 2024 general election. There have been similar incidents reported in smaller regional elections.

=== Double voting ===
Elections which allow non-citizen suffrage or multiple citizenship can violate the one person, one vote principle if one person votes in multiple countries.

== Vote buying ==
Vote buying occurs when a political party or candidate seeks to buy the vote of a voter in an upcoming election. Vote buying can take various forms such as a monetary exchange, as well as an exchange for necessary goods or services.

== Voting process and results ==
A list of threats to voting systems, or electoral fraud methods considered as sabotage are kept by the National Institute of Standards and Technology.

=== Misleading or confusing ballot papers ===
Ballot papers may be used to discourage votes for a particular party or candidate, using design or other features to confuse voters into voting for a different candidate. For example, in the 2000 U.S. presidential election, Florida's butterfly ballot paper was criticized as poorly designed, leading some voters to vote for the wrong candidate. While the ballot itself was designed by a Democrat, it was the Democratic candidate, Al Gore, who was most harmed by voter errors because of this design. Poor or misleading design is usually not illegal and therefore not election fraud from a legal standpoint, but it can nevertheless subvert the principles of democracy.

Sweden has a system with separate ballots used for each party, to reduce confusion among candidates. However, ballots from small parties such as Piratpartiet, Junilistan and Feministiskt initiativ have been omitted or placed on a separate table in the election to the EU parliament in 2009. Ballots from Sweden Democrats have been mixed with ballots from the larger Swedish Social Democratic Party, which used a very similar font for the party name written on the top of the ballot.

Another method of confusing people into mistakenly voting for the wrong candidate is to run candidates or create political parties with names or symbols which are similar to those to an existing candidate or party. The goal is to mislead voters into voting for the false candidate or party. Such tactics may be particularly effective when many voters have limited literacy in the language used on the ballot. Again, such tactics are usually not illegal.

Another possible source of electoral confusion is multiple variations of voting by different electoral systems. This may cause ballots to be counted as invalid if the wrong system is used. For instance, if a voter puts a first-past-the-post cross in a numbered single transferable vote ballot paper, it is invalidated. For example, in Scotland and other parts of the United Kingdom, up to three different voting systems and types of ballots may be used, based on the jurisdictional level of the election. Local elections are determined by single transferable votes; Scottish parliamentary elections by the additional member system; and UK Parliamentary elections by first-past-the-post.

=== Ballot stuffing ===
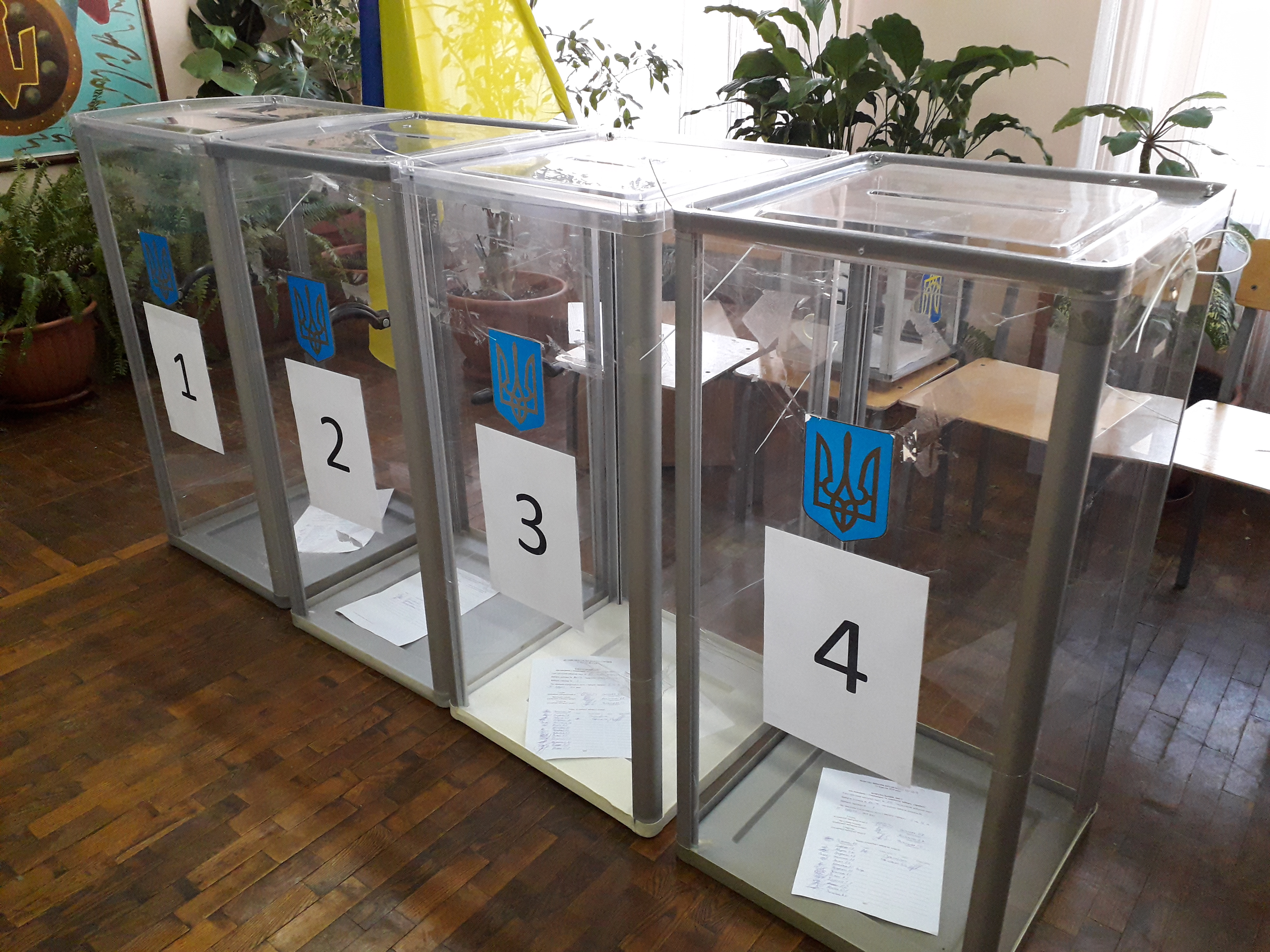
Transparent ballot box used in Ukraine to prevent election officials from pre-stuffing the box with fake ballots

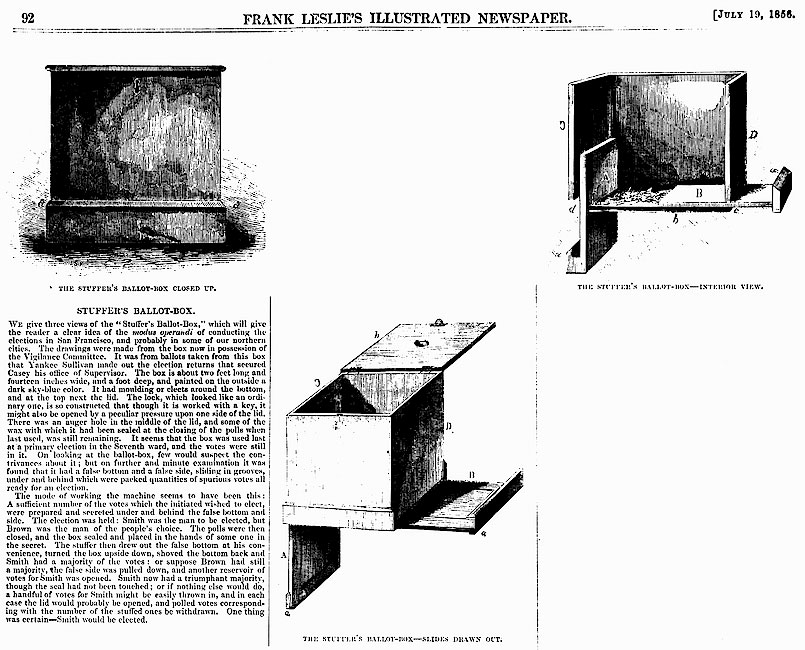
A specialised ballot box used to assist ballot stuffing, featured in Frank Leslie's Illustrated Newspaper in 1856

Ballot stuffing, or "ballot-box stuffing", is the illegal practice of one person submitting multiple ballots during a vote, where typically only one ballot is permitted per person.

- In the 1883 election for the district of Cook, in Queensland, Australia, arrests were made in connection with accusations of ballot stuffing, and the election committee subsequently changed the result of the election
- A 2006 version of the Sequoia touchscreen voting machine had a yellow service "back" button on the back that could allow repeated voting under specific circumstances
- During the 2014 Afghan presidential election, Afghanistan's National Directorate of Security (NDS) recorded Ziaul Haq Amarkhel, the secretary of Afghanistan's Independent Election Commission, telling local officials to "take sheep to the mountains, stuff them, and bring them back", in an apparent reference to ballot stuffing
- During the 2018 Russian presidential election, there were multiple instances, some caught on camera, throughout Russia of voters and polling staff alike stuffing multiple votes in the ballot box.
- Ballot stuffing was also recorded by CCTV footage during the 2024 Russian presidential election.
- Major League Baseball's All-Star Game has had problems with ballot stuffing on occasion, such as in 1957, 1999 and 2015
- Ballot stuffing was reported during the 2024 Georgian parliamentary election.

=== Ballot stacking ===
Ballot stacking is the legal practice of finding and coaxing a person with the same or similar enough name of an existing candidate in the hope of taking away votes from your main opponent. Ballot stacking happened in India in 2019, in Florida in 2020, and in Washington state in 2024. In 2026, this happened with Alaska's two 'Dan Sullivans' in the election of Mary Peltola.

=== Misrecording of votes ===
Votes may be misrecorded at the source, on a ballot paper or voting machine, or later when totals are incorrectly recorded. The 2019 Malawian general election was nullified by the Constitutional Court in 2020 because many results were changed by use of correction fluid, and due to duplicate, unverified and/or unsigned results forms. California allows correction fluid and tape, so changes can be made after the ballot leaves the voter.

Where votes are recorded through electronic or mechanical means, the voting machinery may be altered so that a vote intended for one candidate is recorded for another, or electronic results are duplicated or lost, and there is rarely evidence whether the cause was fraud or error.

Many elections feature multiple opportunities for unscrupulous officials or 'helpers' to record an elector's vote differently from their intentions. Voters who require assistance to cast their votes are particularly vulnerable to having their votes stolen in this way. For example, a blind or illiterate person may be told that they have voted for one party when in fact they have been led to vote for another.

=== Misuse of proxy votes ===
Proxy voting is particularly vulnerable to election fraud, due to the amount of trust placed in the person who casts the vote. In several countries, there have been allegations of retirement home residents being asked to fill out 'absentee voter' forms. When the forms are signed and gathered, they are secretly rewritten as applications for proxy votes, naming party activists or their friends and relatives as the proxies. These people, unknown to the voter, cast the vote for the party to which they are loyal. This is also known as 'granny farming.'

=== Destruction of ballots ===
One method of electoral fraud is to destroy ballots recording votes for an opposing candidate or party.

While mass destruction of ballots can be difficult to achieve without drawing attention, in a very close election it may be possible to destroy a small number of ballot papers without detection, changing the overall result. Blatant destruction of ballot papers can invalidate an election, so that it must be re-run. If a party can improve its vote in the re-run election, it can benefit from ballot destruction as long as it is not linked to it.

During the Bourbon Restoration in late 19th century Spain, the organized "loss" of voting slips (pucherazo) was used to maintain an agreed-upon alternation between the Liberals and the Conservatives. This system of local political domination, especially rooted in rural areas and small cities, was known as caciquismo.

=== Invalidation of ballots ===
Another method is to make it appear that the voter has spoiled his or her ballot, thus rendering it invalid. For example, this can be done by adding another mark to the paper, making it appear that the voter has invalidly voted for too many candidates. The degree to which such intentional spoliation would be feasible, while avoiding detection, would vary by locale. It can be particularly effective in jurisdictions where actual ballot spoiling by the voter also occurs. For example, ballots might be fraudulently altered to emulate protest votes in jurisdictions that recently abolished a "none of the above" or "against all" voting option. Voters might also truly vote invalidly as an act of civil disobedience where voting is mandatory, or to attempt to discredit or invalidate an election. An unusually large share of invalidated ballots may be attributed to loyal supporters of candidates that lost in primaries or previous rounds, did not run or did not qualify to do so, or some manner of protest movement or organized boycott.

In 2016, during the EU membership referendum, Leave-supporting voters in the UK alleged without evidence that the pencils supplied by voting stations would allow votes to be erased from the ballot.

=== Tampering with electronic voting systems ===
==== General tampering ====
All voting systems face threats of some form of electoral fraud. The types of threats that affect voting machines vary. Research at Argonne National Laboratories revealed that a single individual with physical access to a machine, such as a Diebold Accuvote TS, can install inexpensive, readily available electronic components to manipulate its functions.

Other approaches include:

- Tampering with the software of a voting machine to add malicious code that alters vote totals or favors a candidate in any way.
  - Multiple groups have demonstrated this possibility
  - Private companies manufacture these machines. Many companies will not allow public access or review of the machines' source code, claiming fear of exposing trade secrets
- Tampering with the hardware of the voting machine to alter vote totals or favor any candidate.
  - Some of these machines require a smart card to activate the machine and vote. However, a fraudulent smart card could attempt to gain access to voting multiple times or be pre-loaded with negative votes to favor one candidate over another, as has been demonstrated
- Abusing the administrative access to the machine by election officials might also allow individuals to vote multiple times
- Election results that are sent directly over the internet from the polling place centre to the vote-counting authority can be vulnerable to a man-in-the-middle attack, where they are diverted to an intermediate website where the man in the middle flips the votes in favour of a certain candidate and then immediately forwards them on to the vote-counting authority. All votes sent over the internet violate the chain of custody and hence should be avoided by driving or flying memory cards in locked metal containers to the vote-counters. For purposes of getting quick preliminary total results on election night, encrypted votes can be sent over the internet, but final official results should be tabulated the next day only after the actual memory cards arrive in secure metal containers and are counted

==== South Africa ====
In the 1994 South African general election – the first with equal voting rights for different ethnicities, and the one won by Nelson Mandela – South Africa's election compilation system was hacked. As a result, the votes were re-tabulated by hand.

==== Ukraine ====
In 2014, Ukraine's central election system was hacked. Officials found and removed a virus and said the totals were correct.

=== Voter impersonation ===
==== United Kingdom ====
Academic research has generally found voter impersonation to be 'exceptionally rare' in the UK. The Conservative government passed the Elections Act 2022, which mandated photo identification.

==== United States ====
Voter impersonation is considered extremely rare in the US by experts. Since 2013, several states have passed voter ID laws to counter voter impersonation. Voter ID requirements are generally popular among Americans and proponents have argued that it can be difficult to detect voter impersonation without them. Voter ID laws' effectiveness given the rarity of voter impersonation, and their potential to disenfranchise citizens without the right ID have created controversy. By August 2016, four federal court rulings (Texas, North Carolina, Wisconsin, and North Dakota) overturned laws or parts of such laws because they placed undue burdens on minorities.

Allegations of widespread voter impersonation often turn out to be false. The North Carolina Board of Elections reported in 2017 that out of 4,769,640 votes cast in the November 2016 election in North Carolina, only one illegal vote would potentially have been blocked by the voter ID law. The investigation found fewer than 500 incidences of invalid ballots cast, the vast majority of which were cast by individuals on probation for felony who were likely not aware that this status disqualified them from voting, and the total number of invalid votes was far too small to have affected the outcome of any race in North Carolina in the 2016 election.

=== Artificial results ===
In particularly corrupt regimes, the voting process may be nothing more than a sham, to the point that officials simply announce whatever results they want, sometimes without even bothering to count the votes. While such practices tend to draw international condemnation, voters typically have little if any recourse, as there would seldom be any ways to remove the fraudulent winner from power, short of a revolution.

In Turkmenistan, incumbent President Gurbanguly Berdymukhamedov received 97.69% of votes in the 2017 election, with his sole opponent, who was seen as pro-government, in fact being appointed by Berdymukhamedov. In Georgia, Mikheil Saakashvili received 96.2% of votes in the election following the Rose Revolution while his ally Nino Burjanadze was an interim head of state.

=== Postal ballot fraud ===
In both the United Kingdom and the United States, experts estimate that voting fraud by mail has affected only a few local elections, without likely any impact at the national level. In April 2020, a 20-year voter fraud study by the Massachusetts Institute of Technology found the level of mail-in ballot fraud "exceedingly rare" in the United States, occurring only in "0.00006 percent" of instances nationally, and, with Oregon's mail-in-ballots, "0.000004 percent—about five times less likely than getting hit by lightning".

Types of fraud have included pressure on voters from family or others, since the ballot is not always cast in secret; collection of ballots by dishonest collectors who mark votes or fail to deliver ballots; and insiders changing, challenging or destroying ballots after they arrive.

A measure championed as a way to prevent some types of mail-in fraud has been to require the voter's signature on the outer envelope, which is compared to one or more signatures on file before taking the ballot out of the envelope and counting it. Not all places have standards for signature review, and there have been calls to update signatures more often to improve this review. While any level of strictness involves rejecting some valid votes and accepting some invalid votes, there have been concerns that signatures are improperly rejected from young and minority voters at higher rates than others, with no or limited ability of voters to appeal the rejection.

Some problems can affect several percent of the vote, such as dishonest collectors, overly strict signature verification, or family pressure.

=== Non-citizen voting ===
==== Canada ====
In 2019, Elections Canada identified 103,000 non-citizens who were illegally on Canada's federal voters register. It subsequently identified roughly 3,500 cases of potential non-citizens who voted in 2019, but noted that it was not a coordinated effort and did not affect the result in any riding. "But almost a year after Canadians headed to the polls, the agency says it's still trying to determine how many of those cases — if any — involved non-Canadian citizens casting ballots."

==== United States ====
Illegal non-citizen voting is considered extremely rare in the United States by most experts due to the severe penalties associated with the practice including deportation, incarceration or fines in addition to jeopardizing their attempt to naturalize. The federal form to register a voter does not require proof of citizenship, though non-citizens have been found to vote only in very small numbers.

== In legislature ==
Vote fraud can also take place in legislatures. Some of the forms used in national elections can also be used in parliaments, particularly intimidation and vote-buying. Because of the much smaller number of voters, however, election fraud in legislatures is qualitatively different in many ways. Fewer people are needed to 'swing' the election, and therefore specific people can be targeted in ways impractical on a larger scale. For example, Adolf Hitler achieved his dictatorial powers due to the Enabling Act of 1933. He attempted to achieve the necessary two-thirds majority to pass the Act by arresting members of the opposition, though this turned out to be unnecessary to attain the needed majority. Later, the Reichstag was packed with Nazi party members who voted for the Act's renewal.

In many legislatures, voting is public, in contrast to the secret ballot used in most modern public elections. This may make their elections more vulnerable to some forms of fraud since a politician can be pressured by others who will know how the legislator voted. However, it may also protect against bribery and blackmail, since the public and media will be aware if a politician votes in an unexpected way. Since voters and parties are entitled to pressure politicians to vote a particular way, the line between legitimate and fraudulent pressure is not always clear.

As in public elections, proxy votes are particularly prone to fraud. In some systems, parties may vote on behalf of any member who is not present in parliament. This protects those members from missing out on voting if prevented from attending parliament, but it also allows their party to prevent them from voting against its wishes. In some legislatures, proxy voting is not allowed, but politicians may rig voting buttons or otherwise illegally cast "ghost votes" while absent.

== Detection and prevention ==
The three main strategies for the prevention of electoral fraud in society are:

1. Auditing the election process
2. Deterrence through consistent and effective prosecution
3. Cultivation of mores that discourage corruption

Some of the main fraud prevention tactics can be summarised as secrecy and openness. The secret ballot prevents many kinds of intimidation and vote selling, while transparency at all other levels of the electoral process prevents and allows detection of most interference.

Electoral fraud is generally considered difficult to prove, as perpetrators are highly motivated to conceal their acts. Researchers must often rely on inferential methods to uncover unusual patterns that could indicate election fraud, as fraud often cannot be observed directly.

=== Election audits ===
Election auditing refers to any review conducted after polls close for the purpose of determining whether the votes were counted accurately (a results audit) or whether proper procedures were followed (a process audit), or both.

Audits vary and can include checking that the number of voters signed in at the polls matches the number of ballots, seals on ballot boxes and storage rooms are intact, computer counts (if used) match hand counts, and counts are accurately totaled.

Election recounts are a specific type of audit, with elements of both results and process audits.

=== Prosecution ===
In the United States the goal of prosecutions is not to stop fraud or keep fraudulent winners out of office; it is to deter and punish years later. The Justice Department has published Federal Prosecution of Election Offenses in eight editions from 1976 to 2017, under Presidents Ford, Carter, Reagan, Clinton, Bush and Trump. It says, "Department does not have authority to directly intercede in the election process itself. ... overt criminal investigative measures should not ordinarily be taken ... until the election in question has been concluded, its results certified, and all recounts and election contests concluded." Sentencing guidelines provide a range of 0–21 months in prison for a first offender; offense levels range from 8 to 14. Investigation, prosecution and appeals can take over 10 years.

In the Philippines, former President Gloria Macapagal Arroyo was arrested in 2011 following the filing of criminal charges against her for electoral sabotage, in connection with the 2007 Philippine general election. She was accused of conspiring with election officials to ensure the victory of her party's senatorial slate in the province of Maguindanao, through the tampering of election returns.

=== Secret ballot ===
The secret ballot, in which only the voter knows how they have voted, is believed by many to be a crucial part of ensuring free and fair elections through preventing voter intimidation or retribution. Others argue that the secret ballot enables election fraud (because it makes it harder to verify that votes have been counted correctly) and that it discourages voter participation. Although the secret ballot was sometimes practiced in ancient Greece and was a part of the Constitution of the Year III of 1795, it only became common in the nineteenth century. Secret balloting appears to have been first implemented in the former British colony—now an Australian state—of Tasmania on 7 February 1856. By the turn of the century, the practice had spread to most Western democracies.

In the United States, the popularity of the Australian ballot grew as reformers in the late 19th century sought to reduce the problems of election fraud. Groups such as the Greenbackers, Nationalist, and more fought for those who yearned to vote, but were exiled for their safety. George Walthew, Greenback, helped initiate one of the first secret ballots in America in Michigan in 1885. Even George Walthew had a predecessor in John Seitz, Greenback, who campaigned a bill to "preserve the purity of elections" in 1879 after the discovery of Ohio's electoral fraud in congressional elections.

The efforts of many helped accomplish this and led to the spread of other secret ballots all across the country. As mentioned on February 18, 1890, in the Galveston News "The Australian ballot has come to stay. It protects the independence of the voter and largely puts a stop to vote to buy." Before this, it was common for candidates to intimidate or bribe voters, as they would always know who had voted which way.

=== Transparency ===
Most methods of preventing electoral fraud involve making the election process completely transparent to all voters, from nomination of candidates through casting of the votes and tabulation. A key feature in ensuring the integrity of any part of the electoral process is a strict chain of custody.

To prevent fraud in central tabulation, there has to be a public list of the results from every single polling place. This is the only way for voters to prove that the results they witnessed in their election office are correctly incorporated into the totals.

End-to-end auditable voting systems provide voters with a receipt to allow them to verify their vote was cast correctly, and an audit mechanism to verify that the results were tabulated correctly and all votes were cast by valid voters. However, the ballot receipt does not permit voters to prove to others how they voted, since this would open the door towards forced voting and blackmail. End-to-end systems include Punchscan and Scantegrity, the latter being an add-on to optical scan systems instead of a replacement.

In many cases, election observers are used to help prevent fraud and assure voters that the election is fair. International observers (bilateral and multilateral) may be invited to observe the elections (examples include election observation by the Organisation for Security and Cooperation in Europe (OSCE), European Union election observation missions, observation missions of the Commonwealth of Independent States (CIS), as well as international observation organised by NGOs, such as CIS-EMO, European Network of Election Monitoring Organizations (ENEMO), etc.). Some countries also invite foreign observers (i.e. bi-lateral observation, as opposed to multi-lateral observation by international observers).

In addition, national legislatures of countries often permit domestic observation. Domestic election observers can be either partisan (i.e. representing interests of one or a group of election contestants) or non-partisan (usually done by civil society groups). Legislations of different countries permit various forms and extents of international and domestic election observation.

Election observation is also prescribed by various international legal instruments. For example, paragraph 8 of the 1990 Copenhagen Document states that "The [OSCE] participating States consider that the presence of observers, both foreign and domestic, can enhance the electoral process for States in which elections are taking place. They, therefore, invite observers from any other CSCE participating States and any appropriate private institutions and organisations who may wish to do so to observe the course of their national election proceedings, to the extent permitted by law. They will also endeavour to facilitate similar access for election proceedings held below the national level. Such observers will undertake not to interfere in the electoral proceedings".

Critics note that observers cannot spot certain types of election fraud like targeted voter suppression or manipulated software of voting machines.

=== Statistical indicators and election forensics ===
Various forms of statistics can be indicators of election fraud—e.g., exit polls which diverge from the final results. Well-conducted exit polls serve as a deterrent to electoral fraud. However, exit polls are still notoriously imprecise. For instance, in the Czech Republic, some voters are afraid or ashamed to admit that they voted for the Communist Party (exit polls in 2002 gave the Communist party 2–3 percentage points less than the actual result). Variations in willingness to participate in an exit poll may result in an unrepresentative sample compared to the overall voting population.

When elections are marred by ballot-box stuffing (e.g., the Armenian presidential elections of 1996 and 1998), the affected polling stations will show abnormally high voter turnouts with results favouring a single candidate. By graphing the number of votes against turnout percentage (i.e., aggregating polling stations results within a given turnout range), the divergence from bell-curve distribution gives an indication of the extent of the fraud. Stuffing votes in favour of a single candidate affects votes vs. turnout distributions for that candidate and other candidates differently; this difference could be used to quantitatively assess the number of votes stuffed. Also, these distributions sometimes exhibit spikes at round-number turnout percentage values. High numbers of invalid ballots, overvoting or undervoting are other potential indicators. Risk-limiting audits are methods to assess the validity of an election result statistically without the effort of a full election recount.

Though election forensics can determine if election results are anomalous, the statistical results still need to be interpreted. Alan Hicken and Walter R. Mebane describe the results of election forensic analyses as not providing "definitive proof" of fraud. Election forensics can be combined with other fraud detection and prevention strategies, such as in-person monitoring.

=== Voting machine integrity ===
One method for verifying voting machine accuracy is 'parallel testing', the process of using an independent set of results compared to the original machine results. Parallel testing can be done prior to or during an election. During an election, one form of parallel testing is the voter-verified paper audit trail (VVPAT) or verified paper record (VPR). A VVPAT is intended as an independent verification system for voting machines designed to allow voters to verify that their vote was cast correctly, to detect possible election fraud or malfunction, and to provide a means to audit the stored electronic results. This method is only effective if statistically significant numbers of voters verify that their intended vote matches both the electronic and paper votes.

On election day, a statistically significant number of voting machines can be randomly selected from polling locations and used for testing. This can be used to detect potential fraud or malfunction unless manipulated software would only start to cheat after a certain event like a voter pressing a special key combination (Or a machine might cheat only if someone does not perform the combination, which requires more insider access but fewer voters).

Another form of testing is 'Logic & Accuracy Testing (L&A)', pre-election testing of voting machines using test votes to determine if they are functioning correctly.

=== Open source ===
Another method to ensure the integrity of electronic voting machines is independent software verification and certification. Once a software is certified, code signing can ensure the software certified is identical to that which is used on election day. Some argue certification would be more effective if voting machine software was publicly available or open source. VotingWorks has created an open-source voting system in the United States.

Certification and testing processes conducted publicly and with oversight from interested parties can promote transparency in the election process. The integrity of those conducting testing can be questioned.

Testing and certification can prevent voting machines from being a black box where voters cannot be sure that counting inside is done as intended.

One method that people have argued would help prevent these machines from being tampered with would be for the companies that produce the machines to share the source code, which displays and captures the ballots, with computer scientists. This would allow external sources to make sure that the machines are working correctly.

== See also ==
- Administrative resource
- Branch stacking
- Carousel voting
- Cash-for-votes scandal
- Cooping
- Election ink
- Electoral fraud in the United States
- Electoral integrity
- Family voting
- Foreign electoral intervention
- Gerrymandering
- Identity document forgery
- Sham election
- Wasted vote
