= OSV =

OSV may be:

- OSV-96, a Russian anti-materiel rifle
- Object–subject–verb word order
- Offshore vessel
- Old Sturbridge Village
- Open-source voting
- Our Sunday Visitor, American Catholic newspaper and publisher
- OSv, an operating system for virtual machines
- ÖSV, Austrian Ski Association
