= Open-source voting system =

An open-source voting system (OSVS), also known as open-source voting (or OSV), is a voting system that uses open-source software (and/or hardware) that is completely transparent in its design in order to be checked by anyone for bugs or issues. Free and open-source systems can be adapted and used by others without paying licensing fees, improving the odds they achieve the scale usually needed for long-term success. The development of open-source voting technology has shown a small but steady trend towards increased adoption since the first system was put into practice in Choctaw County, Mississippi in 2019.

== Significance ==
=== Security and trust ===
Systems where more people can understand more of the process and get insights into details serve a similar purpose to election observers who help to inspire trust with increased transparency and verification. Additionally, when 90% of the market of election systems in the United States, for example, are run by 'murky' and 'inscrutable' private equity companies, conspiracy theories can flourish alongside serious vulnerabilities. With quicker identification and correction of issues than under proprietary systems, organizations such as the U.S. Defense Department and NASA opt to incorporate open-source software. Cities, for example, can have their own staff work on software with the vendors when out in the open, allowing for faster patches and enhancing their election security. The consensus among the information security community is that a widely used open-source system should be more secure than a closed one, as more people tend to be willing and able to check for vulnerabilities.

=== Cost Savings ===
In addition to increased transparency creating more trust and security, open-source software can lower costs for elections. A VotingWorks bid in a Mississippi county, for example, was 50% less than the other vendors using proprietary software, while its machines in 2021 were listed at 1/3 the price of the average machine. Open-source software allows maintenance costs to be controlled via vendor competition (rather than dependence on just a couple vendors), and to be shared with other jurisdictions as they employ the software.

Proprietary vendors are not transparent about their costs, estimates found that roughly 2/3 of their revenue came from support, maintenance and services. Private vendors also have sued governments trying to switch to a more reliable process.

== Development milestones ==
In 2004, Open Voting Consortium demonstrated a "Dechert Design" GPL open source paper ballot printing and scanner voting system. In 2008, Open Voting Consortium demonstrated the system at a mock election for LinuxWorld. In 2019, Microsoft made its ElectionGuard software open-source, which the company claims is used by all major manufacturers of voting systems (in the United States), however they have come under fire for obstructing the adoption of open-source election software. In 2020, Los Angeles County became the first U.S. jurisdiction to implement its own publicly owned election system. The Los Angeles attempt at open source voting was dismissed by Open Source Initiative as a failed project when it did not meet accepted open source standards. A condition of the Secretary of State's approval was to open-source the code by October 1, 2021, but had not met that commitment as of February 2022.

San Francisco applied to run a limited pilot in November 2022 using VotingWorks, but California's Secretary of State asked the City to resubmit their application when the nonprofit's ranked-choice voting module was closer to completion.

== Adoption ==
Mississippi was the first state to have local jurisdictions use open-source voting systems to cast and count ballots. In New Hampshire, the towns of Ashland, Newington and Woodstock piloted that same open-sourced software system in the fall of 2022 with an eye to possible statewide adoption of VotingWorks' open-source systems by 2024.

Open-source election risk-limiting audit systems have been implemented statewide in the U.S. states of Georgia, Michigan, Pennsylvania, Rhode Island, and Virginia and in local jurisdictions in California, Nevada, New Jersey, North Carolina, and Washington.

== See also ==
- Election security
- End-to-end auditable voting systems
- VotingWorks
