= Cast vote record =

Electronic record of voter selections

A cast vote record (CVR) is an electronic record of a voter's selections in an election, created when ballots are scanned or votes are cast electronically. The term is used predominantly in the context of elections in the United States. CVRs serve as the digital representation of how voters voted and are used for tabulating election results, conducting audits, and verifying election outcomes. CVRs are anonymized, though some privacy concerns have been raised, especially in the context of small precincts.

CVRs differ from ballot images, which are digital pictures of actual ballots obtained from an optical scanner. While ballot images show everything on a ballot including stray marks and write-ins, CVRs represent only the machine's interpretation of those marks as votes. Unlike aggregated election results that show vote totals by precinct, CVRs provide ballot-level data that enables detailed analysis of voting patterns and audit capabilities. CVRs contain data showing how each anonymized ballot was marked, typically appearing as spreadsheets with zeros and ones indicating votes for each contest and candidate.

== History and development ==
Cast vote records have existed in various forms since electronic voting systems were introduced. Los Angeles County began making CVRs available to the public in the 1980s when members of the public could rent magnetic tapes containing what are now called CVRs. The development of modern CVR standards began in earnest in the 2010s as part of efforts to improve election transparency and auditability. Most voting machines support the export of CVR data, including systems by Dominion, ES&S, and Hart.

In 2015, NIST established a public working group to develop common data format specifications for CVRs. This resulted in the publication of NIST Special Publication 1500-103 in November 2019, establishing the first formal standard for CVR data formats.

== Public availability ==
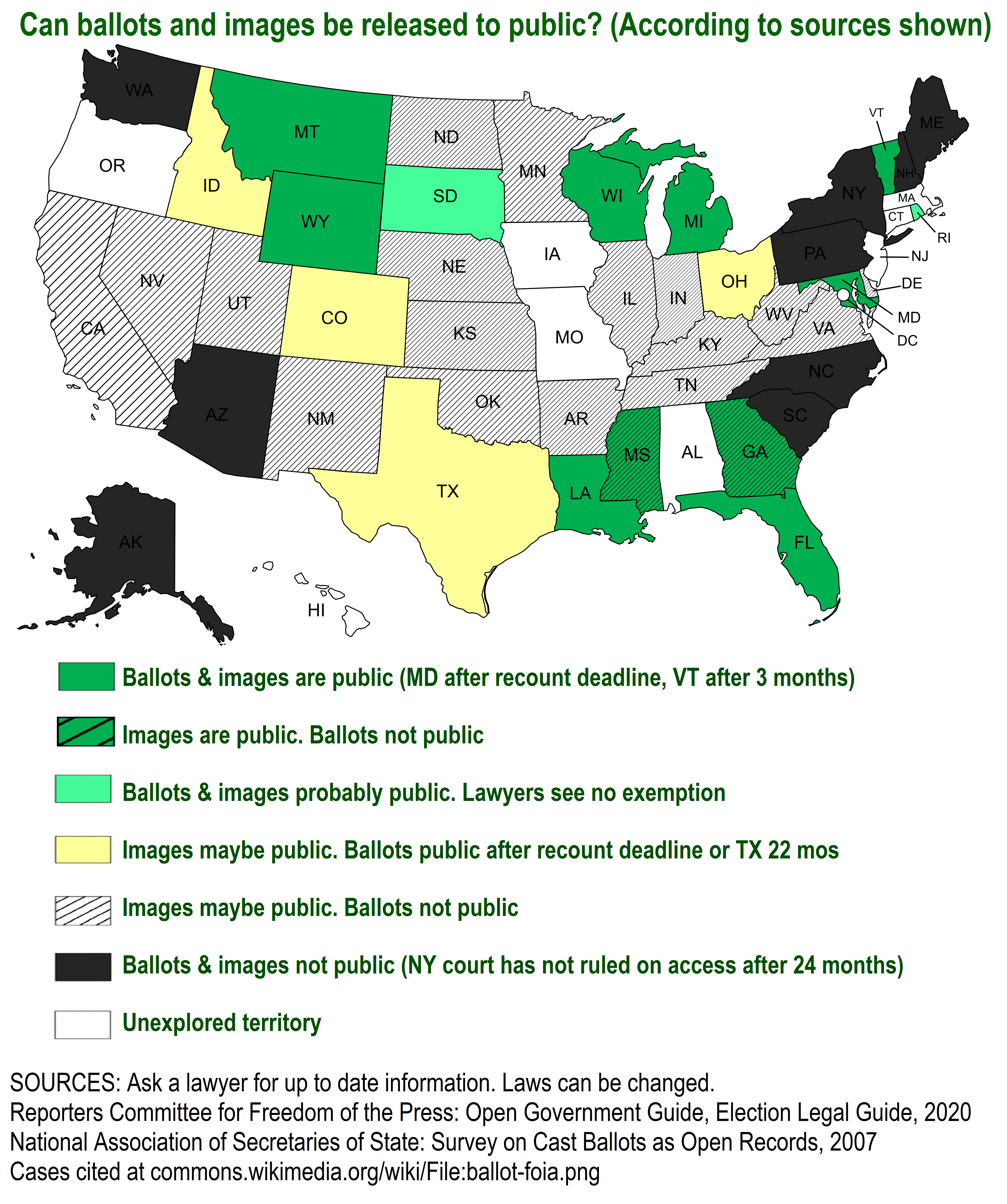
Availability of ballot data by U.S. state (details available in the image description)

The availability of CVRs to the public varies significantly by jurisdiction, with some jurisdictions posting CVRs online, while others provide CVRs only through public records requests. Other jurisdictions do not disclose CVRs. For example, in March 2024, Commonwealth Court of Pennsylvania decided that CVRs are not subject to public disclosure, given that Pennsylvania's Elections Code provides that election records are public "except the contents of ballot boxes and voting machines and records of assisted voters," with the Court determining that CVRs are the "electronic, modern-day equivalent" of ballot box contents.

Notable jurisdictions making CVRs publicly available include many Colorado counties, San Francisco (which publishes a CVR with each release of results, including preliminary results), Dane County, Wisconsin (as part of "Do It Yourself Audit" program), and many jurisdictions using ranked-choice voting, including Alaska, Maine, and New York City.

Following the 2020 United States presidential election, election offices experienced a surge in public records requests for CVRs, often from activists searching for evidence of fraud. This included coordinated campaigns encouraging supporters to file identical requests, which some election officials compared to denial-of-service attacks due to the volume overwhelming their offices.

Databases of CVR data have been compiled by academic researchers and electoral reform advocates.

== Uses and applications ==
=== Election audits ===
CVRs form an important part of risk-limiting audits, where they are used to compare a random sample of stored physical paper ballots against their interpretation in the cast vote. In addition, using the CVR data, an independent computer can tabulate the votes independently of earlier tabulations to get new totals, with humans reporting any differences in interpretations and total tallies.

=== Research ===
Academic researchers use CVR data to study many aspects of elections and voting, since this data allows them to correlate voter choices across different races. In particular, CVR data allows researchers to study the prevalence and extent of split-ticket voting (where voters choose candidates from different political parties for different offices decided during the same election), and thereby quantify partisanship in voting patterns. The data also allows researchers to analyze ballot design effects in more detail, including quantifying the effect of ranked-choice voting ballots on the rate of invalid votes and understanding different kinds of invalid choices such as undervotes and overvotes.

Researchers in voting theory and social choice also use CVR data. In ranked-choice elections, the data allows them to compare different preferential voting rules, and to understand how often instant-runoff voting exhibits paradoxes. Researchers have also used them to explore new types of voting systems such as proportional multi-issue voting methods.

== Privacy considerations ==
While CVRs are anonymized, the public release of CVRs can raise potential privacy concerns. In particular, in small precincts, unique voting patterns may identify individual voters, and there could be a potential for vote buying through pre-arranged voting patterns, especially in complex ballots such as ranked-choice vote elections. However, researchers found, using Maricopa County's 2020 election as a case study, that "the release of individual ballot records [CVRs] would lead to no revelation of any vote choice for 99.83% of voters as compared to 99.95% under Maricopa's current practice of reporting aggregate results by precinct and method of voting".

Proponents argue CVRs enhance election transparency by enabling independent verification of vote counts, supporting risk-limiting audits, and allowing researchers to study voting behavior.

== Technical specifications ==
CVRs come in various formats depending on the voting system vendor and jurisdiction. Common formats include spreadsheet files (CSV, Excel) with ballots in rows and offices or contests in columns, or XML or JSON files with more detailed information but that require programming knowledge to analyze.

The NIST CVR specification supports data interchange in both XML and JSON formats to promote interoperability between different voting systems. It also defines a comprehensive data model using Unified Modeling Language (UML) that supports multiple voting methods (plurality, ranked choice, cumulative voting), CVR snapshots showing different processing stages, adjudication tracking, digital signatures and hash values for verification, and allows association with ballot images.

A CVR typically includes:

- Voter choices for each race
- Indications of how the scanner has interpreted various marks (such as the darkness of a filled-in bubble, undervotes and overvotes, or write-ins)
- Ballot style identifier (mail, early, Election Day, overseas/military)
- Precinct associated with the CVR
- The equipment that produced the CVR

== See also ==
- Risk-limiting audit
