= Election =

Process by which a population chooses the holder of a public office

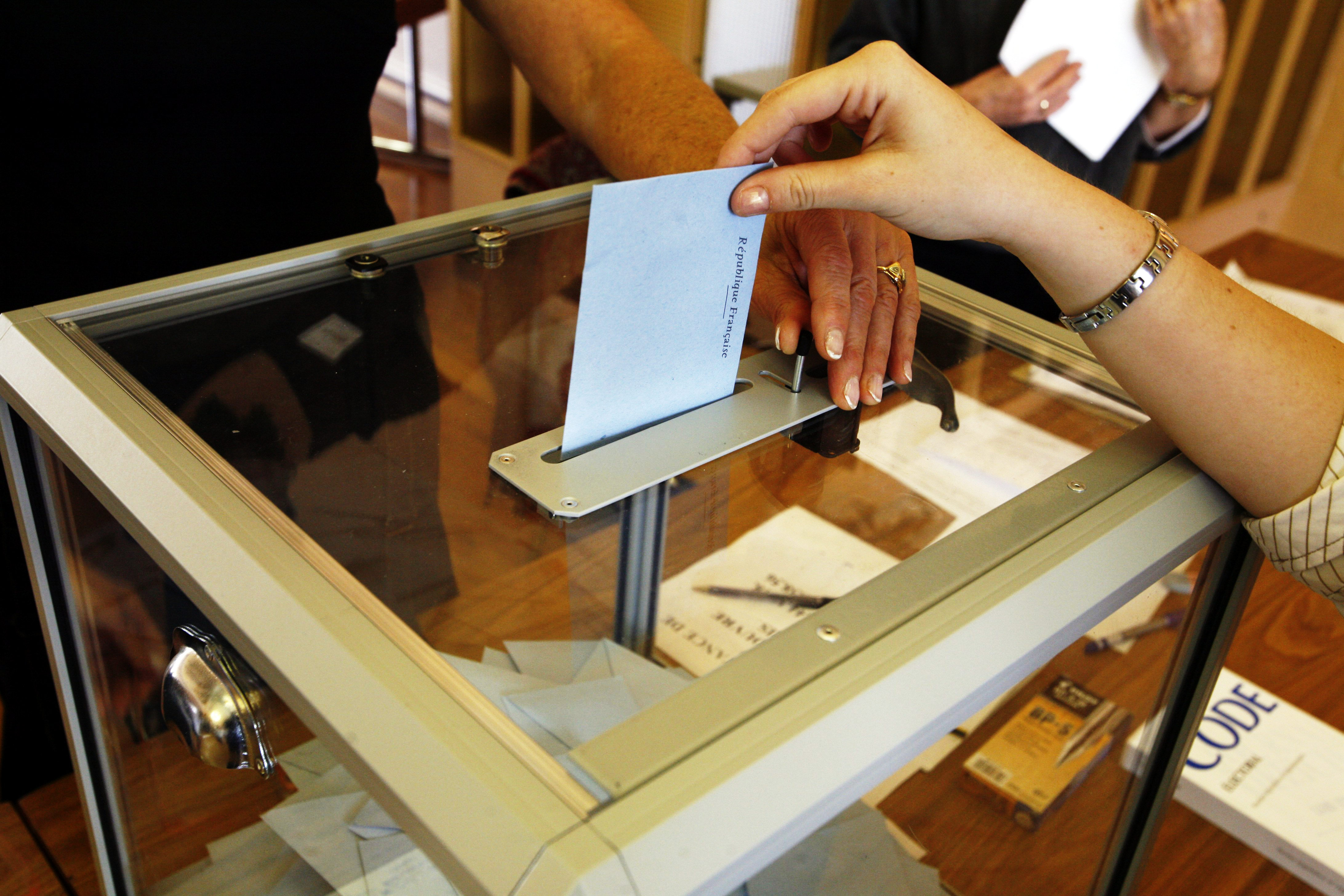
A ballot box system used by the Constitutional Council and the Ministry of Interior for the 2007 French presidential election

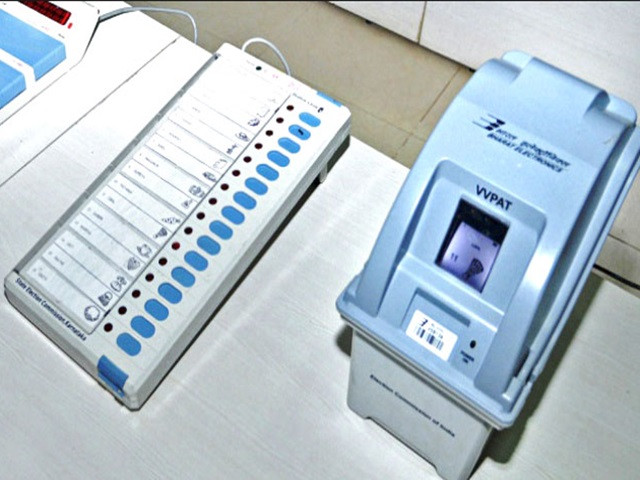
An electronic voting machine with a voter-verified paper audit trail machine of the Election Commission of India used for the 2019 Indian general election

Elected political leaders index

An election is a group decision-making process whereby a portion or all of a population or group votes to choose an individual or multiple individuals to hold public office or other position of responsibility.

Elections have been the usual mechanism by which representative democracy has operated since the 17th century. Elections may fill offices in the legislature, sometimes in the executive and judiciary, and for regional and local government, such as cities or towns. This process is also used in many other Standardized Associations, public businesses, and organizations, from clubs to voluntary association and corporations.

The global use of elections as a tool for selecting representatives in modern representative democracies is in contrast with the practice in the democratic archetype, ancient Athens, where the elections were considered an oligarchic institution and most political offices were filled using allotment, also known as "sortition", by which office holders were chosen by lot.

Electoral reform is the process of introducing fair electoral systems where they are not in place, or improving the fairness or effectiveness of existing systems.

Psephology is the study of results and other statistics relating to elections (especially with a view to predicting future results).

The term elect means "to select or to nominate", so sometimes other forms of balloting such as referendums are referred to as elections, especially in the United States.

== History ==
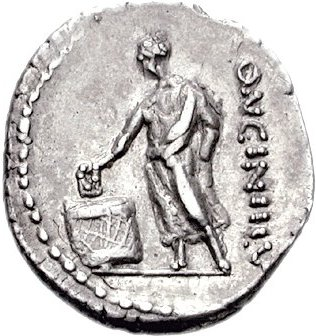
Roman coin depicting election

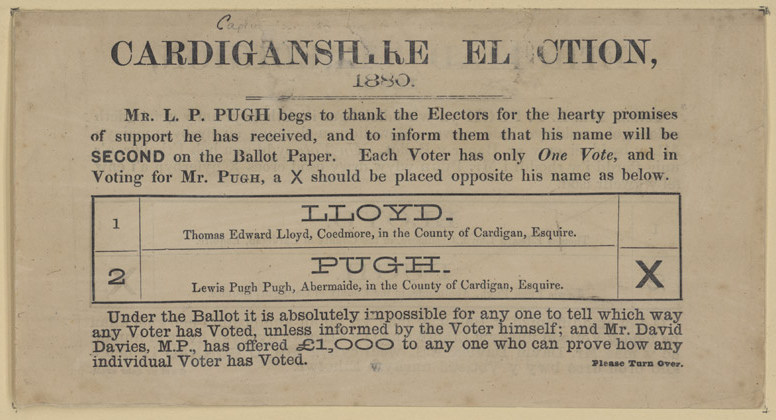
A British election campaign leaflet with an illustration of an example ballot paper, 1880

Elections were used as early in history as ancient Greece and ancient Rome, and throughout the Medieval period to select rulers such as the Holy Roman Emperor (see imperial election) and the pope (see papal election).

The Pala King Gopala (ruled c. 750s – 770s CE) in early medieval Bengal was elected by a group of feudal chieftains. Such elections were quite common in contemporary societies of the region. In the Chola Empire, around 920 CE, in Uthiramerur (in present-day Tamil Nadu), palm leaves were used for selecting the village committee members. The leaves, with candidate names written on them, were put inside a mud pot. To select the committee members, a young boy was asked to take out as many leaves as the number of positions available. This was known as the Kudavolai system.

The first recorded popular elections of officials in public office, where all citizens were eligible both to vote and to hold public office, date back to the ephors of Sparta in 754 BC, under the mixed government of the Spartan Constitution when a multiple-winner plurality-style election system and voice voting was used. Athenian democratic elections, where all citizens could hold public office, were not introduced for another 247 years, until the reforms of Cleisthenes. Under the earlier Solonian Constitution (c. 574 BC), all Athenian citizens were eligible to vote in the popular assemblies, on matters of law and policy, and as jurors, but only the three highest classes of citizens could vote in elections. Nor were the lowest of the four classes of Athenian citizens (as defined by the extent of their wealth and property, rather than by birth) eligible to hold public office, through the reforms of Solon. The Spartan election of the ephors, therefore, also predates the reforms of Solon in Athens by approximately 180 years.

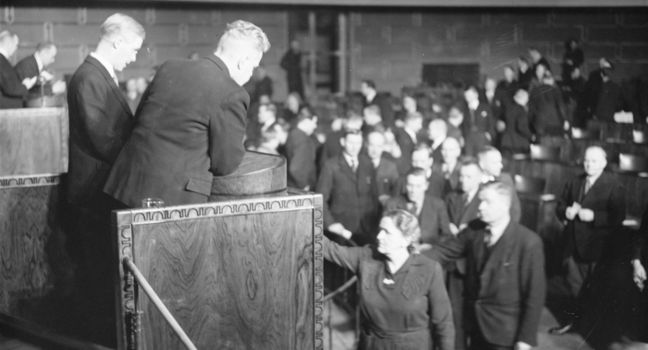
In 1946 Mannerheim resigned as president of Finland, and the parliament of Finland elected prime minister Paasikivi to succeed him, with 159 votes.

Questions of suffrage, especially suffrage for minority groups, have dominated the history of elections. Males, the dominant cultural group in North America and Europe, often dominated the electorate and continue to do so in many countries. Early elections in countries such as the United Kingdom and the United States were dominated by landed or ruling class males. By 1920 all Western European and North American democracies had universal adult male suffrage (except Switzerland) and many countries began to consider women's suffrage. Despite legally mandated universal suffrage for adult males, political barriers were sometimes erected to prevent fair access to elections (see civil rights movement).

== Contexts ==
Elections are held in a variety of political, organizational, and corporate settings. Many countries hold elections to select people to serve in their governments, but other types of organizations hold elections as well. For example, many corporations hold elections among shareholders to select a board of directors, and these elections may be mandated by corporate law. In many places, an election to the government is usually a competition among people who have already won a primary election within a political party. Elections within corporations and other organizations often use procedures and rules that are similar to those of governmental elections.

== Electorate ==
=== Suffrage ===
The question of who may vote is a central issue in elections. The electorate does not generally include the entire population; for example, many countries prohibit those who are under the age of majority from voting. All jurisdictions require a minimum age for voting.

In Australia, Aboriginal people were not given the right to vote until 1962 (see 1967 referendum entry) and in 2010 the federal government removed the rights of prisoners serving for three years or more to vote (a large proportion of whom were Aboriginal Australians).

Suffrage is limited to citizens of the country to ensure equal voting rights ("One man, one vote"). Persons with multiple citizenships voting in multiple countries would violate the equal representation in voting.

In the European Union, one can vote in municipal elections if one lives in the municipality and is an EU citizen; the nationality of the country of residence is not required.

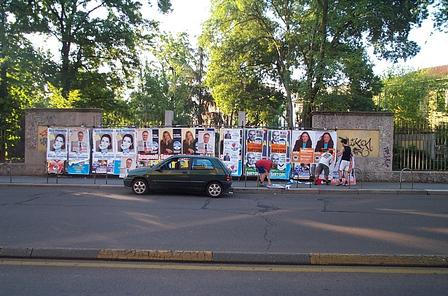
Campaigners working on posters in Milan, Italy, 2004

In some countries, voting is required by law. Eligible voters may be subject to punitive measures such as a fine for not casting a vote. In Western Australia, the penalty for a first time offender failing to vote is a $20.00 fine, which increases to $50.00 if the offender refused to vote prior.

=== Voting population ===
Historically the size of eligible voters, the electorate, was small due to the size of groups or communities and to the limited number privileged to vote like aristocrats and men of a city (citizens).

With more people having bourgeois citizen rights outside of cities, expanding the term citizen, the electorates grew to numbers beyond the thousands. Elections with an electorate in the hundred thousands appeared in the final decades of the Roman Republic, by extending voting rights to citizens outside of Rome with the Lex Julia of 90 BC, reaching an electorate of 910,000 and estimated voter turnout of maximum 10% in 70 BC, only again comparable in size to the first elections of the United States. At the same time the Kingdom of Great Britain had in 1780 about 214,000 eligible voters, 3% of the whole population. Naturalization can reshape the electorate of a country.

== Candidates ==
A representative democracy requires a procedure to govern nomination for political office. In many cases, nomination for office is mediated through preselection processes in organized political parties.

Non-partisan systems tend to be different from partisan systems as concerns nominations. In a direct democracy, one type of non-partisan democracy, any eligible person can be nominated. Although elections were used in ancient Athens, in Rome, and in the selection of popes and Holy Roman emperors, the origins of elections in the contemporary world lie in the gradual emergence of representative government in Europe and North America beginning in the 17th century. In some systems no nominations take place at all, with voters free to choose any person at the time of voting—with some possible exceptions such as through a minimum age requirement—in the jurisdiction. In such cases, it is not required (or even possible) that the members of the electorate be familiar with all of the eligible persons, though such systems may involve indirect elections at larger geographic levels to ensure that some first-hand familiarity among potential electees can exist at these levels (i.e., among the elected delegates).

Electability of a candidate is connected to the likelihood a candidate is elected.

== Systems ==
Map showing the main types of electoral systems used to elect candidates to the lower or sole (unicameral) house of national legislatures, as of January 2022: Majoritarian representation (winner-take-all) Proportional representation Mixed-member majoritarian representation Mixed-member proportional representation Semi-proportional representation (non-mixed) No election (e.g. Monarchy)

In a democracy, the members of the government are elected by a portion of the people who vote in an election. Elections are a way for an electorate to elect, that is choose, from two or more different candidates.

Many countries in the world see elections fought principally between two opposing parties, known as a two-party system. These two will be the most established and most popular parties in the country. For example, in the US, the competition is between the Republicans and the Democrats. Many other countries have multi-party systems where different socio-economic classes, ethnic and racial groups, regions and other diversities each have their own party.

In an indirect or representative democracy, voting and elections are the method by which the people choose the people who will represent them, whilst making decisions. Under Direct democracy the people vote to show their preferences to make policy decisions directly without selecting a representative to decide for them.

A majority vote is when more than half of voters vote for the same person or party. This happens any time only two are in the running for a post but only sometimes when two or more candidates are in the running. Plurality is when the successful candidate or candidates are decided just by relative strength, having more votes than the other candidates, whether in a multiple-winner context or in a single-winner context.

Many countries use a combination of factors to decide who has power, not the at-large "popular vote" using either the majority or plurality method. Most influential of these factors are districts that divide the electorate. For example, in any country where first past the post is used in numerous separate districts such as the UK, a party winning plurality in a majority of constituencies wins majority government, but they often do not have a majority of votes, and sometimes not even the most individual votes (i.e. another party may have more votes but the party still takes more seats). (It is possible for a party to win plurality in a minority of constituencies (but more than any other one party) and thus win minority government.)

Electoral systems consist of the detailed constitutional arrangements and voting systems that convert the vote into a political decision.

The first step is for each voter to cast a ballot, which may be a simple single-choice ballot or another type such as multiple choice or a ranked ballot. Then the votes (either taken at-large or in electoral districts) are tallied, for which various vote counting systems may be used. The voting system then allocates the seats on the basis of the tally. Most systems allocate seats based on relative strength (pluralities), majorities, or proportional representation, or a a mixture of these systems.

Among the proportional systems, the most commonly used are party-list proportional representation (list PR). Among majority- or plurality-based systems the common systems include first-past-the-post electoral system (single winner plurality voting) and different methods of majority voting (such as the widely used two-round system). Mixed systems combine elements of both proportional and majoritarian/plurality systems, with some (mixed-member proportional) typically producing results closer to the former and others (e.g. parallel voting) sometimes having just as much dis-proportionality as first past the post.

Many countries have electoral reform movements that advocate for change to other election systems such as proportional representation, approval voting, single transferable vote, instant runoff voting or a Condorcet method. These alternative systems also are popular for lesser elections in some countries where more important elections still use more traditional counting methods.

While openness and accountability are usually considered cornerstones of a democratic system, the act of casting a vote and the content of a voter's ballot are usually an important exception. The secret ballot is a relatively modern development, but it is now considered crucial in most free and fair elections, as it limits the effectiveness of intimidation.

=== Electoral systems ===
Many electoral methods are used in the world. The purpose of an election may be to choose one person, such as a president, or a group of members, such as a committee or a parliament. In electing a parliament, either each of many small constituencies elects a single representative, as in elections to the United Kingdom parliament; or each of a lesser number of multi-member constituencies elects two or more representatives, as in Ireland; or multi-member districts and some single-member districts can be used; or the entire country can be treated as one "at-large" district, as in The Netherlands.

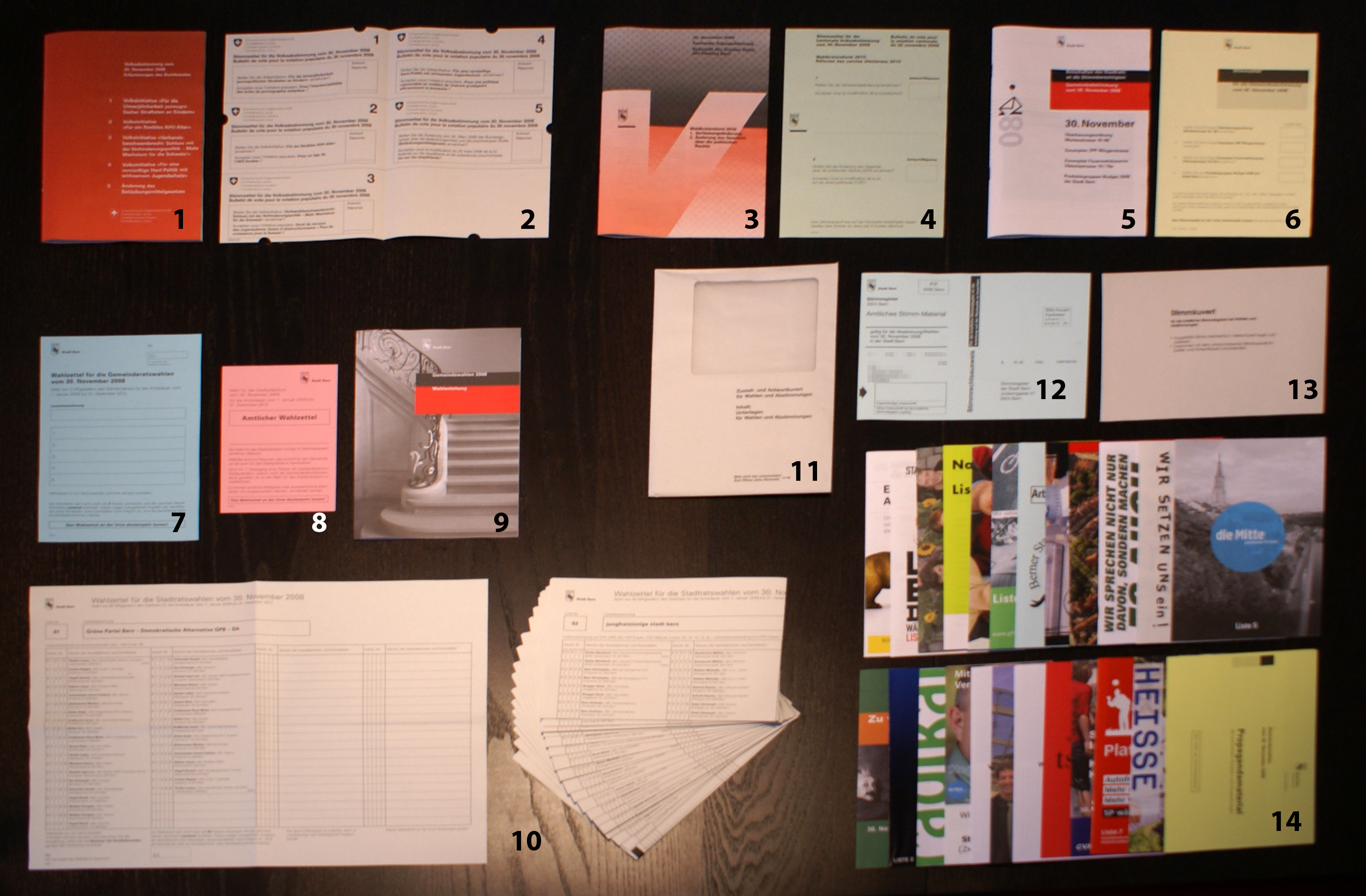
In Switzerland, without the need to register, every citizen receives at home the ballot papers and information brochure for each voting (and can send it by post). Switzerland has a direct democracy system and votes (and elections) are organized about four times a year; here, to Berne's citizens in November 2008 about 5 national, 2 cantonal, 4 municipal referendums, and 2 elections (government and parliament of the City of Berne) to take care of at the same time.

Different voting systems require different levels of support to be elected. Plurality voting (First-past-the-post voting) elects the candidate with more votes than any other single candidate. It does not require the winner to achieve a majority, to have more than half of the total votes cast. In First-past-the-post voting, when more than two candidates run, the winner commonly has less than half of the vote, as few as 18 percent were recorded in 2014 in Toronto.

In Instant-runoff voting, a candidate must have a majority of votes to be elected, although presence of exhausted votes may mean that the majority at time of final count is not majority of votes cast initially.

In STV, any candidate who takes quota (usually set at much less than half of the votes) is elected; others without quota (but with more votes than any other single candidate) may be declared elected as well.

Side effects of First-past-the-post voting include a waste of votes due to vote splitting, a two-party system and political polarization due to electing candidates that do not support centrism. To understand why a race using First-past-the-post voting tends to favor less-centric candidates, consider a simple lab experiment where students in a class vote for their favorite marble. If five marbles are assigned names and are placed "up for election", and if three of them are green, one is red, and one is blue, then a green marble will rarely win the election. The reason for the green's lack of success is vote splitting. The three green marbles will split the votes of those who prefer green. In fact, in this analogy, the only way that a green marble is likely to win is if more than three-fifths of the voters prefer green. If the same number of people prefer green as those who prefer red and blue, that is to say, if one-third of the voters prefer green, one-third prefer blue, and one-third prefer red, then each green marble will only get one-ninth of the vote, if the green marbles each take same number of votes, while the red and blue marbles will each get one-third, putting the green marbles at a serious disadvantage. If the experiment is repeated with other colors, the color that is in the majority (if the majority is split among multiple choices) will still rarely win. In other words, from a purely mathematical perspective, a single-winner system tends to favor a winner that is different from the majority, if the majority runs multiple candidates, and if the minority group runs just one candidate. This minority rule success can also result if multiple winners are elected and voters cast multiple votes (Plurality block voting). But even if the majority is split among multiple candidates, proportionate results can still be produced if votes can be transferred, as under STV, or if multiple winners are elected and each voter has just one vote.

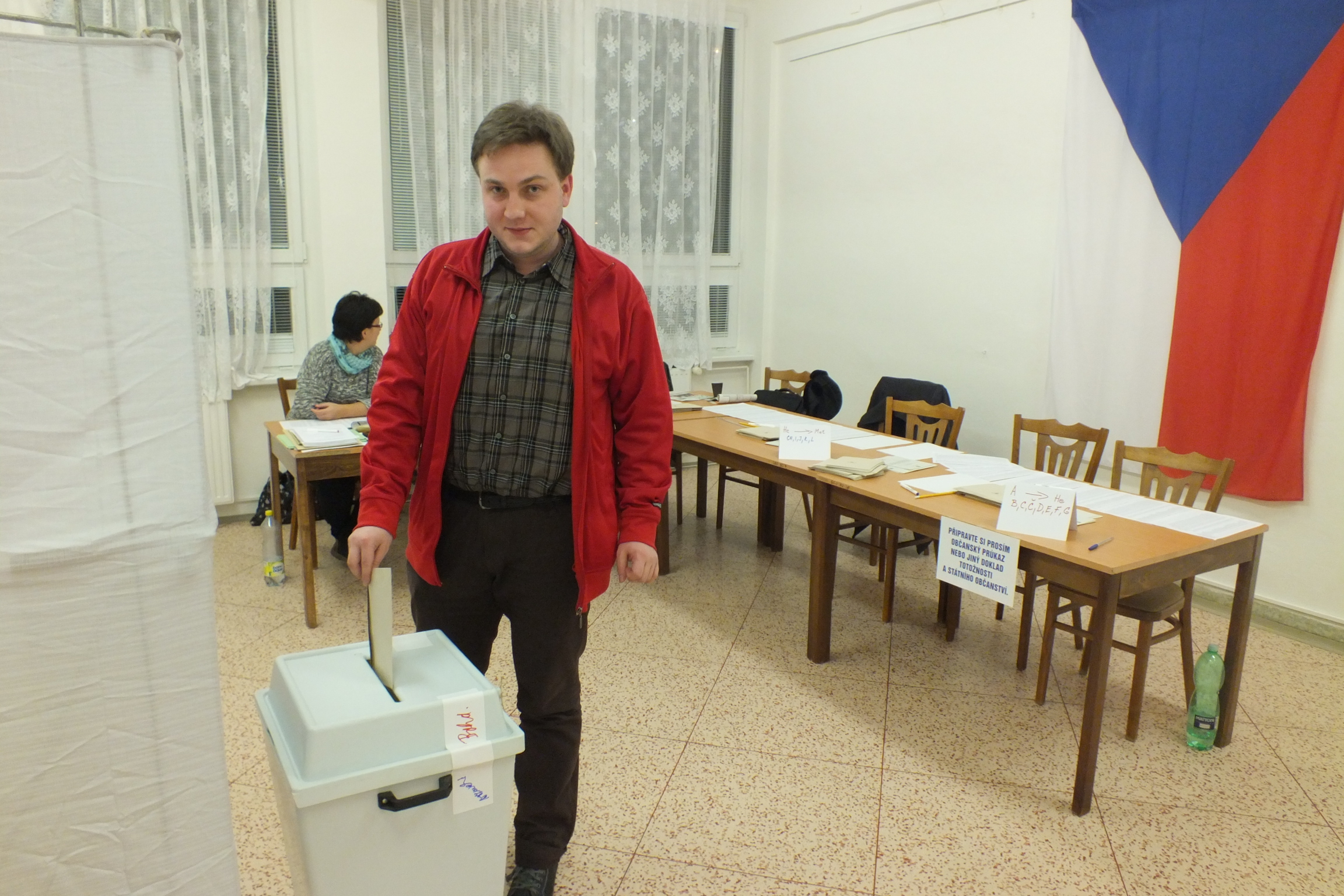
A man voting in the Czech Republic in 2014

Alternatives to first-past-the-post voting include approval voting, two-round, proportional representation, and instant-runoff voting. With approval voting, voters are encouraged to vote for as many candidates as they approve of, so the winner is much more likely to be any one of the five marbles because people who prefer green will be able to vote for every one of the green marbles. With two-round elections, the field of candidates is thinned prior to the second round of voting. In most cases, the winner must receive a majority of the votes, which is more than half. If no candidate obtains a majority in the first round, then the two candidates with the most significant plurality run again for the second round of voting. Variants exist regarding these two points: the requirement for being elected at the first round is sometimes less than 50%, and the rules for participation in the runoff may vary.

block voting are often used for at-large positions such as members of a city council. In a voting system that uses multiple votes (Plurality block voting), the voter can vote for a multiple-member subset of the running candidates. So, a voter might vote for Alice, Bob, and Charlie, rejecting Daniel and Emily. Approval voting uses such multiple votes.

Instant-runoff voting and STV uses single ranked votes.

In IRV, if no single candidate has 50% of the vote, then the candidate with the fewest votes is excluded and their votes are redistributed according to the voter's nominated order of preference. The process repeats itself until a candidate has 50% or more votes. The system is designed to produce the same result as an exhaustive ballot but using only a single round of voting.

Under STV, ranked voting is used in a proportional representation format. PR-STV is used in Australia, Ireland and Malta. Voters rank candidates to indicate first preference and back-up preferences. Quota is calculated. In say a four-seat constituency, quota is 20 percent of the valid vote plus 1 (if Droop quota is used). Every candidate with quota (of 1st preferences alone or combination of first preferences and later preferences) will be elected. If a candidate has more than a quota and seats are yet to be filled, his/her surplus will be distributed to other candidates in proportion to the voter's preferences marked on the vote if any. If there are still candidates to be elected and no surplus votes to be transferred, the least-popular candidate is eliminated, as above in AV or IRV, and the process continues until four candidates have reached a quota or are declared elected when the field of candidates is thinned to the number of remaining open seats.

In the Quota Borda System (QBS), the voters also cast their preferences, 1,2,3,4... as they wish. In the analysis, all 1st preferences are counted; all 2nd preferences are counted; after these preferences have been translated into points per the rules of a Modified Borda Count (MBC), the candidates' points are also counted. Seats are awarded to any candidates with a quota of 1st preferences; to any pair of candidates with two quotas of 1st/2nd preferences; and if seats are still to be filled, to those candidates with the highest MBC scores.

In a voting system that uses a ranked vote, the voter ranks the candidates in order of preference. For example, they might mark a preference for Bob in the first place, then Emily, then Alice, then Daniel, and finally Charlie. Ranked voting systems, such as those used in Australia and Ireland, use a ranked vote.

In a voting system that uses a scored vote (or range vote), the voter gives each alternative a number between one and ten (the upper and lower bounds may vary). See cardinal voting systems.

Some "multiple-winner" systems such as the Single Non-Transferable Vote, SNTV, used in Afghanistan and Vanuatu, allow a voter to cast one vote even though multiple members are elected in the district.

The Condorcet rule is used (sometimes) in decision-making. The voters or elected representatives cast their preferences on one, some, or all options, 1,2,3,4... as in PR-STV or QBS. In the analysis, option A is compared to option B, and if A is more popular than B, then A wins this pairing. Next, A is compared with option C, then D, and so on. Likewise, B is compared with C, D, etc. The option which wins the most pairings, (if there is one), is the Condorcet winner.→

== Campaigns ==
When elections are called, politicians and their supporters attempt to influence policy by competing directly for the votes of constituents in what are called campaigns. Supporters for a campaign can be either formally organized or loosely affiliated, and frequently utilize campaign advertising. It is common for political scientists to attempt to predict elections via political forecasting methods.

The most expensive election campaign included US$7 billion spent on the 2012 United States presidential election and is followed by the US$5 billion spent on the 2014 Indian general election.

== Timing ==
The nature of democracy is that elected officials are accountable to the people, and they must return to the voters at prescribed intervals to seek their mandate to continue in office. For that reason, most democratic constitutions provide that elections are held at fixed regular intervals. In the United States, elections for public offices are typically held between every two and six years in most states and at the federal level, with exceptions for elected judicial positions that may have longer terms of office. There is a variety of schedules, for example, presidents: the President of Ireland is elected every seven years, the President of Russia and the President of Finland every six years, the President of France every five years, President of the United States every four years.

Predetermined or fixed election dates have the advantage of fairness and predictability. They tend to greatly lengthen campaigns, and make dissolving the legislature (parliamentary system) more problematic if the date should happen to fall at a time when dissolution is inconvenient (e.g. when war breaks out). Other states (e.g., the United Kingdom) only set maximum time in office, and the executive decides exactly when within that limit it will actually go to the polls. In practice, this means the government remains in power for close to its full term, and chooses an election date it calculates to be in its best interests (unless something special happens, such as a motion of no-confidence). This calculation depends on a number of variables, such as its performance in opinion polls and the size of its majority. Postponing elections beyond the full term has been connected with democratic backsliding. Wartime elections have been typically delayed unless electoral integrity can be ensured.

Snap elections are early elections before the full term of office.

Rolling elections are elections in which all representatives in a body are elected, but these elections are spread over a period of time rather than all at once. Examples are the presidential primaries in the United States, Elections to the European Parliament (where, due to differing election laws in each member state, elections are held on different days of the same week) and, due to logistics, general elections in Lebanon and India. The voting procedure in the Legislative Assemblies of the Roman Republic are also a classical example.

In rolling elections, voters have information about previous voters' choices. While in the first elections, there may be plenty of hopeful candidates, in the last rounds consensus on one winner is generally achieved. In today's context of rapid communication, candidates can put disproportionate resources into competing strongly in the first few stages, because those stages affect the reaction of latter stages.

== Undemocratic or unfair elections ==
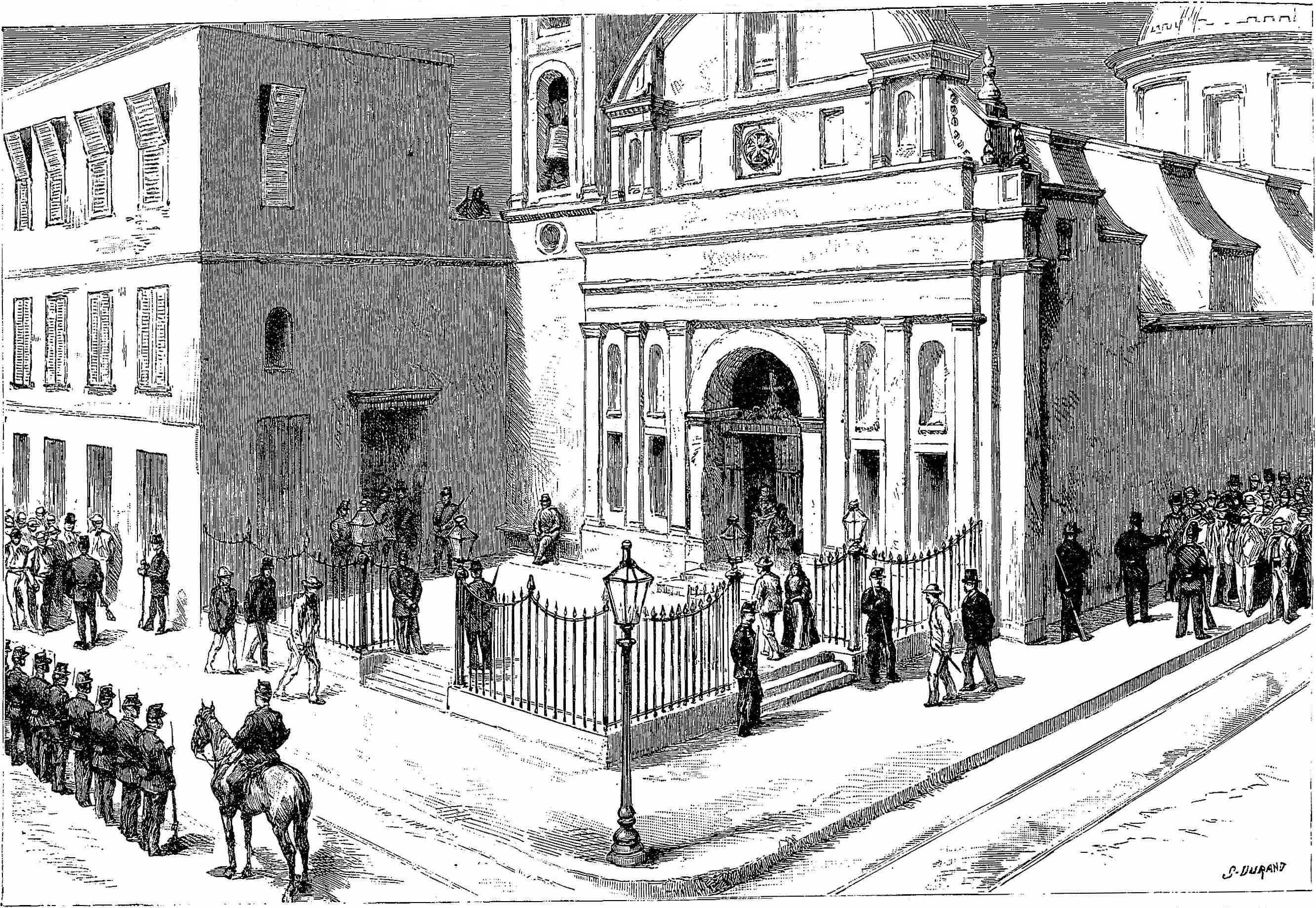
Buenos Aires 1892: "The rival voters were kept back by an armed force of police out of sight to others. Only batches of two or three were allowed to enter the polling office at a time. Armed sentries guarded the gates and the doors." Godefroy Durand, The Graphic, 21 May 1892.

In many of the countries with weak rule of law, the most common reason why elections do not meet international standards of being "free and fair" is interference from the incumbent government. Dictators may use the powers of the executive (police, martial law, censorship, physical implementation of the election mechanism, etc.) to remain in power despite popular opinion in favour of removal. Members of a particular faction in a legislature may use the power of the majority or supermajority (passing criminal laws, and defining the electoral mechanisms including eligibility and district boundaries) to prevent the balance of power in the body from shifting to a rival faction due to an election.

Non-governmental entities can also interfere with elections, through physical force, verbal intimidation, or fraud, which can result in improper casting or counting of votes. Monitoring for and minimizing electoral fraud is also an ongoing task in countries with strong traditions of free and fair elections. Problems that prevent an election from being "free and fair" take various forms.

=== Lack of open political debate or an informed electorate ===
The electorate may be poorly informed about issues or candidates due to lack of freedom of the press, lack of objectivity in the press due to state or corporate control, or lack of access to news and political media. Freedom of speech may be curtailed by the state, favouring certain viewpoints or state propaganda. Scheduling frequent elections can also lead to voter fatigue and political apathy.

=== Violation of political egalitarianism ===
Gerrymandering and wasted votes due to electoral thresholds can prevent all votes from counting equally.

=== Interference with campaigns ===
Exclusion of opposition candidates from eligibility for office, needlessly high nomination rules on who may be a candidate, are some of the ways the structure of an election can be changed to favour a specific faction or candidate. Those in power may arrest or assassinate candidates, suppress or even criminalize campaigning, close campaign headquarters, harass or beat campaign workers, or intimidate voters with violence. Foreign electoral intervention can also occur, with the United States interfering between 1946 and 2000 in 81 elections and Russia or the Soviet Union in 36. In 2018 the most intense interventions, utilizing false information, were by China in Taiwan and by Russia in Latvia; the next highest levels were in Bahrain, Qatar and Hungary.

=== Tampering with mechanisms ===
This can include falsifying voter instructions, violation of the secret ballot, ballot stuffing, tampering with voting machines, destruction of legitimately cast ballots, voter suppression, voter registration fraud, failure to validate voter residency, fraudulent tabulation of results, and use of physical force or verbal intimation at polling places. Other examples include persuading candidates not to run, such as through blackmailing, bribery, intimidation or physical violence.

=== Shams ===
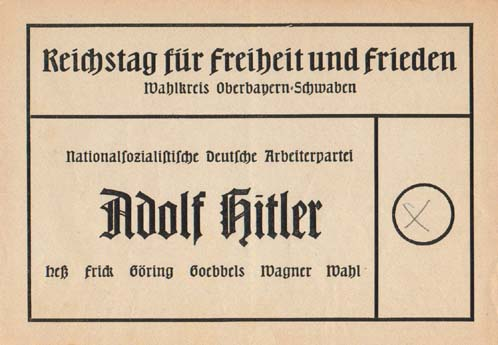
A ballot from the 1936 elections in Nazi Germany

A sham election, or show election is an election that is held purely for show; that is, without any significant political choice or real impact on the results of the election.

Sham elections are a common event in dictatorships that feel the need to feign the appearance of public legitimacy. Published results usually show high voter turnout and high support (typically at least 80%, and close to 100% in many cases) for the prescribed candidates or for the referendum choice that favours the political party in power. Dictatorial regimes can also organize sham elections with results simulating those that might be achieved in democratic countries.

Sometimes, only one government-approved candidate is allowed to run in sham elections with no opposition candidates allowed, or opposition candidates are arrested on false charges (or even without any charges) before the election to prevent them from running. Ballots may contain only one "yes" option, or in the case of a simple "yes or no" question, security forces often persecute people who pick "no", thus encouraging them to pick the "yes" option. In other cases, those who vote receive stamps in their passport for doing so, while those who did not vote (and thus do not receive stamps) are persecuted as enemies of the people.

Sham elections can sometimes backfire against the party in power, especially if the regime believes they are popular enough to win without coercion, fraud or suppressing the opposition. The most famous example of this was the 1990 Myanmar general election, in which the government-sponsored National Unity Party suffered a landslide defeat by the opposition National League for Democracy and consequently, the results were annulled.

== Aristocratic ==
The 2026 V-Dem Electoral and Liberal Democracy Indices

0.90–1.00
0.80–0.89
0.70–0.79
0.60–0.69
0.50–0.59
0.40–0.49
0.30–0.39
0.20–0.29
0.10–0.19
0.00–0.09
No data

Some scholars argue that the predominance of elections in modern liberal democracies masks the fact that they are actually aristocratic selection mechanisms that deny each citizen an equal chance of holding public office. Such views were expressed as early as the time of Ancient Greece by Aristotle. According to French political scientist Bernard Manin, the inegalitarian nature of elections stems from four factors: the unequal treatment of candidates by voters, the distinction of candidates required by choice, the cognitive advantage conferred by salience, and the costs of disseminating information. These four factors result in the evaluation of candidates based on voters' partial standards of quality and social saliency (for example, skin colour and good looks). This leads to self-selection biases in candidate pools due to unobjective standards of treatment by voters and the costs (barriers to entry) associated with raising one's political profile. Ultimately, the result is the election of candidates who are superior (whether in actuality or as perceived within a cultural context) and objectively unlike the voters they are supposed to represent.

Evidence suggests that the concept of electing representatives was originally conceived to be different from democracy. Prior to the 18th century, some societies in Western Europe used sortition as a means to select rulers, a method which allowed regular citizens to exercise power, in keeping with understandings of democracy at the time. The idea of what constituted a legitimate government shifted in the 18th century to include consent, especially with the rise of the enlightenment. From this point onward, sortition fell out of favor as a mechanism for selecting rulers. On the other hand, elections began to be seen as a way for the masses to express popular consent repeatedly, resulting in the triumph of the electoral process until the present day.

This conceptual misunderstanding of elections as open and egalitarian when they are not innately so may thus be a root cause of the problems in contemporary governance. Those in favor of this view argue that the modern system of elections was never meant to give ordinary citizens the chance to exercise power - merely privileging their right to consent to those who rule. Therefore, the representatives that modern electoral systems select for are too disconnected, unresponsive, and elite-serving. To deal with this issue, various scholars have proposed alternative models of democracy, many of which include a return to sortition-based selection mechanisms. The extent to which sortition should be the dominant mode of selecting rulers or instead be hybridised with electoral representation remains a topic of debate.

== See also ==
- Artificial intelligence and elections - Use of AI in elections and political campaigning.
- Ballot access
- Concession (politics)
- Demarchy – "democracy without elections"
- Electoral calendar
- Electoral system
- Election law
- Election litter
- Election official
- Elections by country
- Electronic voting
- Fenno's paradox
- Full slate
- Garrat Elections
- Gerontocracy
- Issue voting
- Landslide election
- List of next general elections
- Meritocracy
- Multi-party system
- Non-human electoral candidate
- Party system
- Pluralism (political philosophy)
- Political polarization
- Political science
- Polling station
- Proportional representation
- Re-election
- Slate
- Stunning elections
- Two-party system
- Voter turnout
- Voting system

== Bibliography ==
- Arrow, Kenneth J. 1963. Social Choice and Individual Values. 2nd ed. New Haven, CT: Yale University Press.
- Benoit, Jean-Pierre and Lewis A. Kornhauser. 1994. "Social Choice in a Representative Democracy". American Political Science Review 88.1: 185–192.
- Corrado Maria, Daclon. 2004. US Elections and War On Terrorism – Interview With Professor Massimo Teodori Analisi Difesa, n. 50
- Farquharson, Robin. 1969. A Theory of Voting. New Haven, CT: Yale University Press.
- Mueller, Dennis C. 1996. Constitutional Democracy. Oxford: Oxford University Press.
- Owen, Bernard, 2002. "Le système électoral et son effet sur la représentation parlementaire des partis: le cas européen", LGDJ;
- Riker, William. 1980. Liberalism Against Populism: A Confrontation Between the Theory of Democracy and the Theory of Social Choice. Prospect Heights, IL: Waveland Press.
- Thompson, Dennis F. 2004. Just Elections: Creating a Fair Electoral Process in the U.S. Chicago: University of Chicago Press. ISBN 978-0226797649
- Ware, Alan. 1987. Citizens, Parties and the State. Princeton: Princeton University Press.
