= Electoral integrity =

Fairness of an electoral process

Electoral integrity refers to the fairness of the entire voting process and how well the process protects against electoral fraud, voter suppression, and other threats to free and fair elections. The consequences of unfree or unfair elections can include doubts in the legitimacy of the outcome, loss of faith in the democratic system, and reduced future participation.

International standards and global norms outline best-practices for conducting elections. These standards have been endorsed in a series of authoritative conventions, treaties, protocols, and guidelines by agencies of the international community, notably by the decisions of the UN General Assembly, by regional bodies such as the Organization for Security and Cooperation in Europe (OSCE), the Organization of American States (OAS), and the African Union (AU), and by member states in the United Nations. Following endorsement, these standards apply universally to all countries throughout the electoral cycle, including during the pre-electoral period, the campaign, on polling day, and in its aftermath.

== Definitions ==
The ACE Electoral Knowledge Network acknowledged the debate around a single definition before recommending the 2012 definition of the Kofi Annan Foundation: "any election that is based on the democratic principles of universal suffrage and political equality as reflected in international standards and agreements, and is professional, impartial, and transparent in its preparation and administration throughout the electoral cycle."

In 2021, the Office of the United Nations High Commissioner for Human Rights published a revised edition of Human Rights and Elections: A Handbook on the Legal, Technical and Human Rights Aspects of Elections, which provides extensive guidance on the conduct of elections.

== International principles ==
Standards for free and fair elections have been expressed in a number of international agreements.

Article 21(3) of the Universal Declaration of Human Rights (1948) states that "[t]he will of the people shall be the basis of the authority of government; this will shall be expressed in periodic and genuine elections which shall be by universal and equal suffrage and shall be held by secret vote or by equivalent free voting procedures."

These commitments were further developed in Article 25 of the UN International Covenant on Civil and Political Rights (ICCPR of 1966), namely the need for:

- periodic elections at regular intervals;
- universal suffrage that includes all sectors of society;
- equal suffrage, in the idea of one-person, one-vote;
- the right to stand for public office and contest elections;
- the rights of all eligible electors to vote;
- the use of a secret ballot process;
- genuine elections;
- elections that reflect the free expression of the will of the people.

The 2002 Venice Commission’s Code of Good Practice in Electoral Matters spells out in detail what is meant by principles such as the universal, equal, free, secret, and direct suffrage. Some of the most detailed standards are contained in the practical guidelines for electoral observers published by regional intergovernmental organizations, exemplified by the Election Observation Handbook of the Organization for Security and Co-operation in Europe. The Code subsequently acquired increasing significance as a form of soft law, particularly through the case law of the European Court of Human Rights (ECtHR). When interpreting obligations under the European Convention on Human Rights, particularly Article 3 of Protocol No. 1, the Court has repeatedly referred to the Code.

Similar principles have been adopted in the guidelines developed by the African Union, European Union, and Organization of American States.

The 1990 Copenhagen Document of the Conference on Security and Cooperation in Europe (CSCE) made commitments that included free elections at regular intervals; the popular election of all seats in at least one chamber; universal and equal suffrage; the right to establish political parties and their clear separation from the state; campaigning in a free and fair atmosphere; unimpeded access to media; secret ballots, with counting and reporting conducted honestly and the results reported publicly; and the due winners being installed and allowed to serve their full terms.

UN General Assembly resolution 63/163 (April 12, 2012) states, "Strengthening the role of the United Nations in enhancing periodic and genuine elections and the promotion of democratization." The language in this document reflects and extends a series of similar statements of principle endorsed regularly by the United Nations since 1991. Resolution 63/163 reaffirms that “democracy is a universal value based on the freely expressed will of the people to determine their own political, economic, social and cultural systems and their full participation in all aspects of their lives.” Thus, democratic principles are explicitly endorsed by the United Nations General Assembly, along with a commitment to “the importance of fair, periodic and genuine elections” as the primary mechanism that allows citizens “to express their will.”

The United Nations or the international community does not endorse any specific institutional design or constitutional mechanisms that can best achieve global norms, leaving this as a matter for national sovereignty. The UN resolution recognizes the responsibility of member states, “for ensuring free and fair elections, free of intimidation, coercion and tampering of vote counts, and that all such acts are sanctioned accordingly.” The United Nations’ role (especially through the Electoral Assistance Division of the Department of Political Affairs and the United Nations Development Programme) is seen as one of providing electoral assistance and support for the promotion of democratization, but only at the specific request of the member state.

== In practice ==
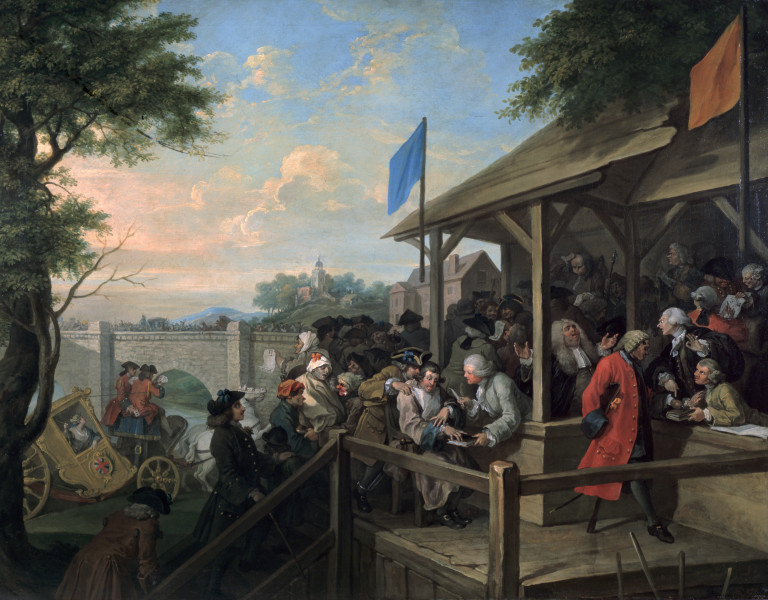
William Hogarth: The Polling (1774–1775)

The contrary notion of 'electoral malpractice' such as an unfair election refers to contests violating international standards and global norms. Problems can arise at every stage of the process, from electoral and ballot access laws favoring incumbents to lack of a level playing field in money and media during campaigns to inaccurate voter registers, flawed counts and partial electoral management bodies.

Flawed or failed elections which suffer from fraud, corruption, or vote-rigging were common in countries holding popular contests in the 18th and 19th century, including in rotten and pocket boroughs in Britain and machine politics in the United States.

Examples of contemporary campaigns attracting considerable international concern are: allegations of irregularities occurring during the 2012 Russian presidential election and the 2016 United Kingdom European Union membership referendum; problems of violence during and after the 2007 Kenyan general election; and controversies in the 2013 Cambodian general election.

=== Indicators ===
The Electoral Integrity Project has presented an annual survey of select academic opinions on electoral integrity since 2012. Kaila White of The Arizona Republic described the methodology as being widely trusted and used to compare electoral performance around the world. Slate reported that North Carolina's 2016 score of 58 just above Cuba, which a 2016 Wall Street Journal opinion piece used to criticize the report. The results of the EIP survey were criticized by statistician Andrew Gelman as "an unstable combination of political ideology, academic self-promotion, credulous journalism, and plain old incompetence."

== See also ==
- Election monitoring – Observation of an election by independent parties
- Election Defense Alliance
- Election security
- Electoral fraud
- Election
- Electronic Registration Information Center
- Free and fair election
- ICCPR
- Open-source voting systems
- Political corruption
- Political finance
- Voter suppression
- Voting rights
- Universal Declaration of Human Rights
