= Free and fair election =

Election which is free of coercion and fraud

A free and fair election is defined as an election in which "coercion is comparatively uncommon". This definition was popularized by political scientist Robert Dahl. A free and fair election involves political freedoms and fair processes leading up to the vote, a fair count of eligible voters who cast a ballot, a lack of electoral fraud or voter suppression, and acceptance of election results by all parties. An election may partially meet international standards for free and fair elections, or may meet some standards but not others.

== Factors ==
A 2016 study evaluated ten dimensions of the conduct of elections between 1975–2011:

1. legal framework (whether there was a constitutional right of citizens to vote and seek office, whether elections were held at regular intervals, and whether election-related laws were not changed immediately before an election);
2. electoral management (whether gerrymandering occurred and whether election management bodies, if they existed, were independent, impartial, and accountable);
3. electoral rights (whether citizens were generally able to vote on the basis of equal suffrage and access);
4. voter registers (whether they were accurate, current, and open to voters for easy and effective voter registration);
5. nomination rules/ballot access (whether candidates had in practice a right to compete in the election, with rejections of candidate applications being based on "internationally recognizable and acceptable norms" and with no candidate receiving more than 75% of the votes, a signal of malpractice or election boycotts);
6. campaign process (whether elections were carried out without violence, intimidation, bribery (vote buying), use of government resources to advantage the incumbent, or a "massive financial advantages" for the incumbent);
7. media access (whether freedom of speech was protected and whether the ruling party was disproportionately benefited by government-owned media);
8. voting process (whether elections were conducted by secret ballot on a one person, one vote basis, with adequate security to protect voters and protection against ballot box stuffing, multiple voting, destruction of valid ballots, and other forms of manipulation);
9. role of officials (whether the election was administered with adequately trained personnel, free from campaigning or intimidation at polling places, and with the ability of international election observers and party representatives to observe polling places); and
10. counting of votes (whether votes were tabulated transparently and free of fraud or tampering)

== Estimates ==
The study of 169 countries from 1975 to 2011 estimated that only about half of elections were free and fair. The study wondered whether the increase in non-democratic regimes holding elections over time alongside a rise in global efforts around election observation led to a rise in the proportion of elections that were deemed to not be free and fair. The presence of election monitors and constraints on executive power were associated with a 31% higher probability of a free and fair elections in the study.

The V-Dem Democracy Indices estimate the cleanliness of elections, share of adult citizens with active suffrage, if top officials are elected, freedom of speech, freedom of information, freedom of association and combine these estimates as the electoral democracy index.

Indices by V-Dem Institute for year 2024
Country	Clean elections index	Share of population with suffrage	Elected officials index	Freedom of Expression and Alternative Sources of Information index	Freedom of association thick index
Denmark	0.96	1.0	1.0	0.98	0.93
Ireland	0.95	1.0	1.0	0.97	0.91
Estonia	0.96	1.0	1.0	0.97	0.91
Switzerland	0.94	1.0	1.0	0.97	0.92
Belgium	0.97	1.0	1.0	0.97	0.89
Norway	0.96	1.0	1.0	0.94	0.91
Sweden	0.95	1.0	1.0	0.95	0.92
Czech Republic	0.95	1.0	1.0	0.96	0.88
Luxembourg	0.94	1.0	1.0	0.96	0.9
France	0.95	1.0	1.0	0.96	0.89
New Zealand	0.96	1.0	1.0	0.95	0.88
Costa Rica	0.94	1.0	1.0	0.91	0.92
Australia	0.96	1.0	1.0	0.94	0.88
Uruguay	0.95	1.0	1.0	0.92	0.89
Finland	0.96	1.0	1.0	0.95	0.85
Chile	0.96	1.0	1.0	0.92	0.87
Iceland	0.92	1.0	1.0	0.91	0.92
Canada	0.94	1.0	1.0	0.94	0.87
United States	0.91	1.0	1.0	0.89	0.95
Germany	0.96	1.0	1.0	0.94	0.85
Austria	0.93	1.0	1.0	0.92	0.89
Latvia	0.92	1.0	1.0	0.93	0.89
United Kingdom	0.93	1.0	1.0	0.91	0.89
Portugal	0.94	1.0	1.0	0.89	0.89
Spain	0.96	1.0	1.0	0.86	0.91
Netherlands	0.96	1.0	1.0	0.89	0.87
Japan	0.93	1.0	1.0	0.85	0.93
Jamaica	0.87	1.0	1.0	0.92	0.89
Italy	0.95	1.0	0.98	0.84	0.9
Brazil	0.84	1.0	1.0	0.93	0.89
Taiwan	0.94	1.0	1.0	0.85	0.88
Lithuania	0.89	1.0	1.0	0.94	0.84
Vanuatu	0.9	1.0	1.0	0.88	0.89
Barbados	0.87	1.0	1.0	0.9	0.86
Malta	0.9	1.0	1.0	0.84	0.9
Cyprus	0.91	1.0	1.0	0.82	0.89
Suriname	0.86	1.0	1.0	0.88	0.86
Cabo Verde	0.84	1.0	1.0	0.85	0.89
Trinidad and Tobago	0.82	1.0	1.0	0.9	0.86
Slovakia	0.93	1.0	1.0	0.81	0.84
Greece	0.95	1.0	1.0	0.82	0.81
Seychelles	0.89	1.0	1.0	0.84	0.83
South Africa	0.81	1.0	1.0	0.84	0.9
East Timor	0.84	1.0	1.0	0.84	0.85
South Korea	0.93	1.0	1.0	0.79	0.82
Poland	0.76	1.0	1.0	0.91	0.86
Panama	0.85	1.0	1.0	0.8	0.88
Croatia	0.91	1.0	1.0	0.79	0.82
Slovenia	0.92	1.0	1.0	0.74	0.86
Israel	0.88	1.0	1.0	0.84	0.78
Argentina	0.87	1.0	1.0	0.76	0.86
Dominican Republic	0.71	1.0	1.0	0.9	0.88
Colombia	0.76	1.0	0.95	0.84	0.9
São Tomé and Príncipe	0.82	1.0	1.0	0.8	0.79
Nepal	0.72	1.0	1.0	0.81	0.87
Ghana	0.67	1.0	1.0	0.86	0.88
Solomon Islands	0.7	1.0	1.0	0.82	0.87
Sri Lanka	0.79	1.0	1.0	0.86	0.74
Lesotho	0.79	1.0	1.0	0.7	0.88
Kosovo	0.75	1.0	1.0	0.77	0.84
Ecuador	0.83	1.0	1.0	0.75	0.77
Bulgaria	0.71	1.0	1.0	0.8	0.83
Peru	0.85	1.0	1.0	0.73	0.74
The Gambia	0.77	1.0	0.96	0.81	0.77
Moldova	0.78	1.0	1.0	0.7	0.84
Romania	0.77	1.0	1.0	0.73	0.8
Armenia	0.68	1.0	1.0	0.73	0.89
Namibia	0.63	1.0	1.0	0.81	0.85
Senegal	0.72	1.0	1.0	0.85	0.71
Montenegro	0.61	1.0	1.0	0.81	0.87
Liberia	0.6	1.0	1.0	0.84	0.84
Guatemala	0.62	1.0	1.0	0.81	0.79
Botswana	0.61	1.0	0.92	0.81	0.86
Malawi	0.6	1.0	1.0	0.79	0.8
Paraguay	0.62	1.0	1.0	0.75	0.8
Bolivia	0.69	1.0	1.0	0.72	0.76
Maldives	0.63	1.0	1.0	0.73	0.78
North Macedonia	0.67	1.0	1.0	0.66	0.81
Bhutan	0.86	1.0	1.0	0.71	0.62
Kenya	0.49	1.0	0.98	0.9	0.75
Honduras	0.4	1.0	1.0	0.88	0.87
Malaysia	0.59	1.0	1.0	0.62	0.8
Fiji	0.54	1.0	1.0	0.75	0.72
Zambia	0.44	1.0	0.97	0.81	0.79
Bosnia and Herzegovina	0.52	1.0	1.0	0.65	0.81
Albania	0.49	1.0	1.0	0.7	0.82
Mexico	0.6	1.0	1.0	0.67	0.7
Nigeria	0.36	1.0	1.0	0.89	0.79
Benin	0.65	1.0	1.0	0.7	0.61
Mongolia	0.61	1.0	1.0	0.69	0.65
Mauritius	0.61	1.0	0.89	0.62	0.79
Guyana	0.42	1.0	0.9	0.78	0.83
Indonesia	0.52	1.0	1.0	0.72	0.69
Georgia	0.47	1.0	1.0	0.7	0.73
Papua New Guinea	0.29	1.0	1.0	0.79	0.87
Sierra Leone	0.25	1.0	0.98	0.82	0.82
Hungary	0.6	1.0	1.0	0.49	0.65
Philippines	0.39	1.0	1.0	0.67	0.72
Tunisia	0.52	1.0	1.0	0.77	0.48
Ivory Coast	0.39	1.0	1.0	0.67	0.71
Somaliland	0.53	1.0	0.75	0.64	0.66
Madagascar	0.23	1.0	1.0	0.7	0.85
Tanzania	0.37	1.0	0.91	0.7	0.69
Singapore	0.8	1.0	1.0	0.34	0.58
India	0.52	1.0	1.0	0.49	0.59
Ukraine	0.6	1.0	1.0	0.42	0.57
Thailand	0.44	0.99	1.0	0.52	0.63
Togo	0.29	1.0	1.0	0.58	0.59
Iraq	0.35	1.0	0.97	0.56	0.53
Lebanon	0.3	1.0	0.5	0.72	0.72
Angola	0.29	1.0	1.0	0.49	0.61
El Salvador	0.32	1.0	1.0	0.39	0.67
Kyrgyzstan	0.42	1.0	1.0	0.49	0.41
Mauritania	0.28	1.0	1.0	0.65	0.42
Democratic Republic of the Congo	0.2	1.0	1.0	0.64	0.53
Serbia	0.21	1.0	1.0	0.42	0.66
Pakistan	0.16	1.0	1.0	0.57	0.57
Mozambique	0.15	1.0	1.0	0.52	0.58
Central African Republic	0.16	1.0	1.0	0.62	0.46
Zanzibar	0.12	1.0	0.82	0.56	0.66
Kuwait	0.66	1.0	0.77	0.59	0.1
Turkey	0.41	1.0	1.0	0.18	0.56
Cameroon	0.14	1.0	1.0	0.6	0.41
Comoros	0.13	1.0	0.93	0.52	0.51
Guinea-Bissau	0.0	1.0	1.0	0.62	0.62
Jordan	0.51	1.0	0.0	0.58	0.58
Uganda	0.12	1.0	0.99	0.52	0.42
Kazakhstan	0.34	1.0	1.0	0.37	0.3
Zimbabwe	0.16	1.0	1.0	0.38	0.5
Morocco	0.45	1.0	0.0	0.6	0.55
Ethiopia	0.34	1.0	1.0	0.27	0.36
Algeria	0.3	1.0	1.0	0.34	0.3
Republic of the Congo	0.1	1.0	1.0	0.4	0.46
Djibouti	0.17	1.0	1.0	0.34	0.39
Niger	0.0	1.0	0.0	0.75	0.68
Gabon	0.0	1.0	0.0	0.76	0.58
Haiti	0.0	1.0	0.0	0.72	0.53
Uzbekistan	0.3	1.0	1.0	0.23	0.14
Palestine (West Bank)	0.0	1.0	1.0	0.32	0.39
Chad	0.06	1.0	0.5	0.48	0.41
Rwanda	0.29	1.0	0.92	0.15	0.17
Bangladesh	0.06	1.0	0.0	0.31	0.42
Mali	0.0	1.0	0.0	0.63	0.47
Venezuela	0.07	1.0	1.0	0.22	0.26
Libya	0.0	1.0	0.0	0.56	0.51
Cambodia	0.1	1.0	1.0	0.16	0.2
Egypt	0.15	1.0	0.98	0.18	0.14
Equatorial Guinea	0.08	1.0	1.0	0.14	0.17
Cuba	0.29	1.0	1.0	0.09	0.02
Burundi	0.07	1.0	0.91	0.17	0.18
Azerbaijan	0.09	1.0	1.0	0.13	0.15
Vietnam	0.51	1.0	1.0	0.14	0.02
Oman	0.69	1.0	0.0	0.15	0.05
Tajikistan	0.1	1.0	1.0	0.12	0.15
Russia	0.14	1.0	1.0	0.08	0.13
Hong Kong	0.3	1.0	0.0	0.34	0.2
Somalia	0.0	0.0	0.5	0.66	0.44
Iran	0.24	1.0	0.5	0.23	0.09
Guinea	0.0	1.0	0.0	0.55	0.24
South Sudan	0.0	1.0	0.5	0.19	0.35
Belarus	0.18	1.0	1.0	0.03	0.07
Burkina Faso	0.0	1.0	0.0	0.35	0.39
Nicaragua	0.15	1.0	1.0	0.03	0.04
Turkmenistan	0.07	1.0	1.0	0.04	0.06
Syria	0.0		0.5	0.07	0.1
Sudan	0.0	1.0	0.0	0.25	0.32
Laos	0.22	1.0	0.5	0.04	0.05
Eswatini	0.38	1.0	0.0	0.12	0.02
Yemen	0.0	1.0	0.0	0.24	0.26
Bahrain	0.22	1.0	0.0	0.13	0.13
United Arab Emirates	0.54	0.36	0.0	0.06	0.04
Palestine (Gaza)	0.0	1.0	0.0	0.07	0.18
Qatar	0.41	0.35	0.0	0.06	0.04
Myanmar	0.0	1.0	0.0	0.05	0.11
North Korea	0.12	1.0	0.0	0.01	0.03
Afghanistan	0.0	1.0	0.0	0.09	0.05
China	0.0	1.0	0.0	0.04	0.04
Eritrea	0.0	1.0	0.0	0.02	0.02
Saudi Arabia	0.0	0.0	0.0	0.09	0.03

== See also ==
- Election subversion
- Electoral integrity
- Polyarchy
- Unfair election
- Voter suppression
