= Azraq refugee camp =

- Refugee camp
- Location in Jordan
- Coordinates: 31.9054°N 36.5809°E
- Country: Jordan
- Governorate: Zarqa Governorate
- Settled: April 2014

Population (2019)
  - Total: 41,000
- figures from December 2024
- Time zone: UTC+2 (UTC+2)
  - Summer (DST): UTC+3 (UTC+3)

The Azraq refugee camp (Arabic: مخيم الأزرق, romanized: Mukhayyam al-Azrak) is a refugee camp, located near Azraq, Jordan, built for refugees of the Syrian Civil War. It was developed, and is operated, by the United Nations High Commissioner for Refugees (UNHCR) in conjunction with the Government of Jordan. It first opened in April 2014. As of March 2016 it had over 32,000 refugees in it; by August 2019 that number was over 35,000. By the time of the fall of the Assad regime, in December 2024, around 41,000 Syrians were believed to be housed in the Azraq refugee camp.

== Development and goals ==
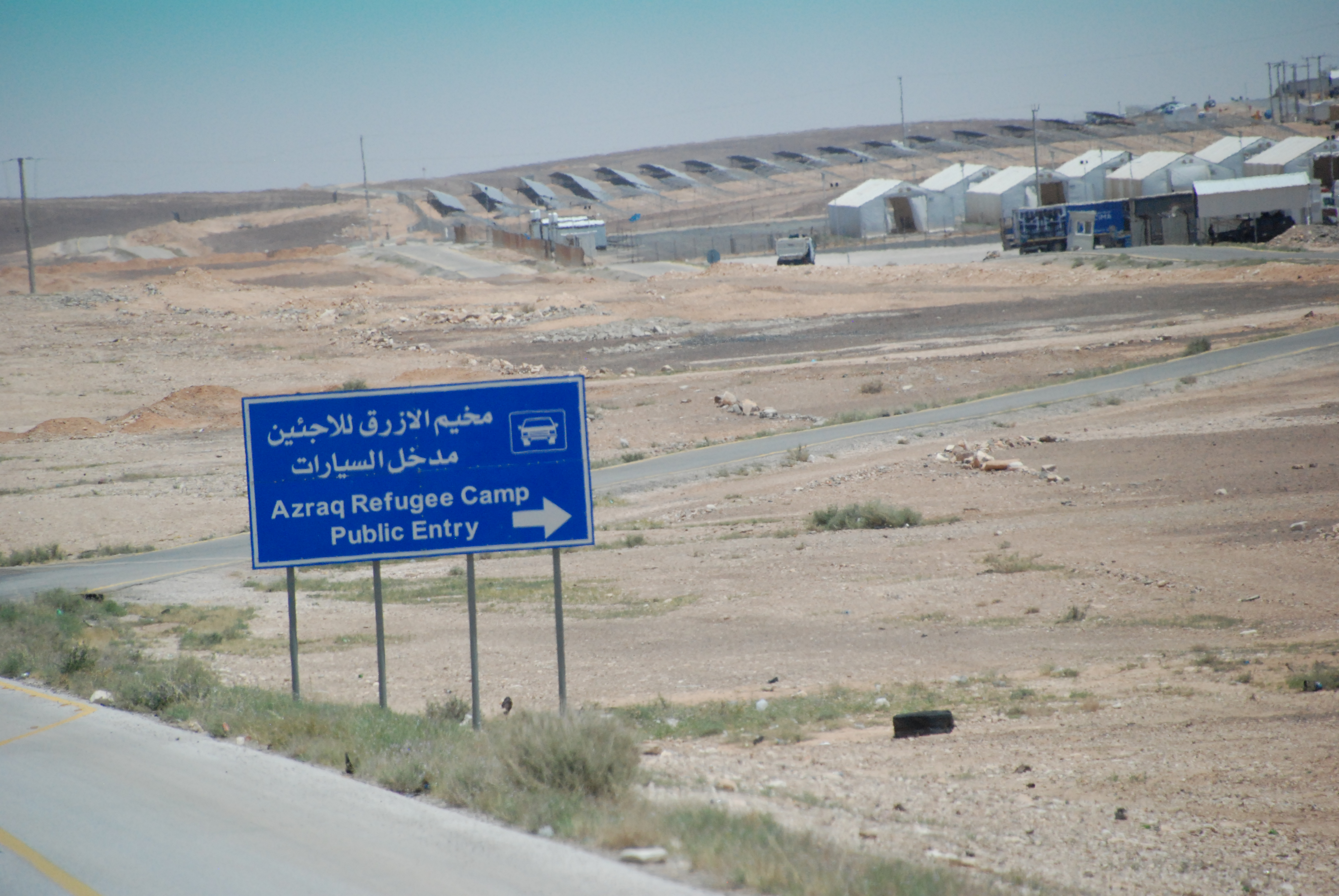
Entrance to the camp, May 2018

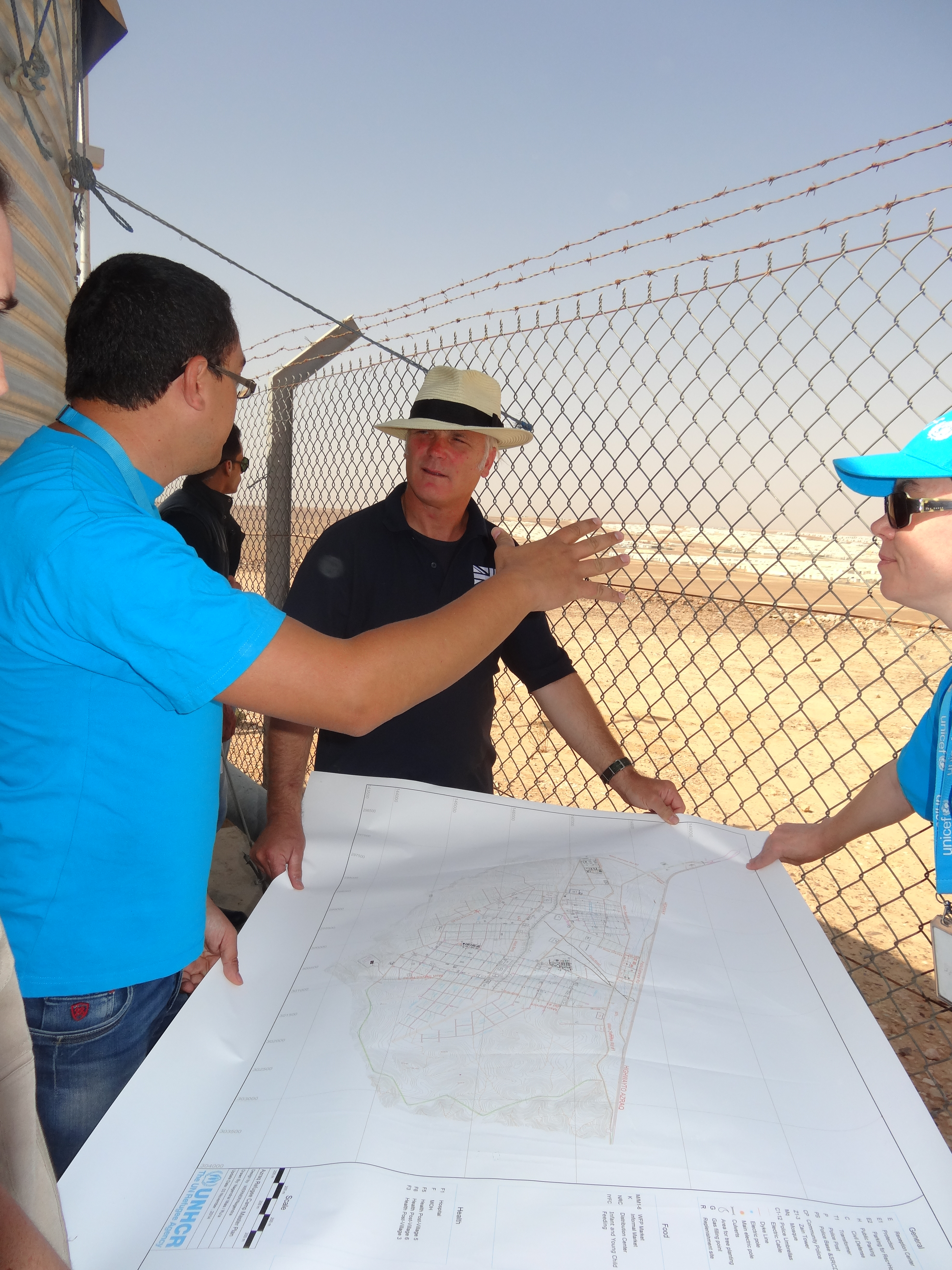
The UK Minister for the Department for International Development, Desmond Swayne, receives a briefing from UNICEF regarding water pumping at the Azraq refugee camp in July 2015

Building of the camp began in May 2013. The site, located 20 kilometres (12 mi) west of Azraq in hot desert terrain and 90 kilometres (56 mi) from the Jordan–Syria border, had been previously used during the Gulf War of 1990–91 as a transit camp for displaced Iraqis and Kuwaitis. The camp itself stretches for some 15 kilometres (9.3 mi).

The signature element of the new camp's appearance were the rows and rows of white cabins with insulation and sloping roofs, to be used as the shelters. The shelters were built with zinc and steel in an effort to withstand the hot and windy conditions. Cement and concrete was not used in the construction of the camp, to emphasize the point that Jordan has made that the camp is not intended to be permanent.

The camp was designed to overcome some of the problems that had been experienced at the overcrowded and trouble-ridden Zaatari refugee camp that was located closer to the border. The facilities of the Azraq camp, such as health clinics and playgrounds for children, were structured in a decentralised manner, with the idea of emulating villages within the camp. In particular, a goal was to support the preservation of the traditional social structures of Syrian communities. Security concerns were also paramount in laying out the camp. The UNHCR head of the camp said in April 2014, "We've studied what's been done in Zaatari and other refugee camps around the world and tried to plan carefully. It's not a luxury that we normally have – to prepare for months with our partners." Another UNHCR official said, "What you see when driving around is possibly one of the best refugee camps in the world." The cost of building the camp was stated at $63.5 million, with funding coming from international donors.

The first refugees began arriving at it on 28 April 2014. When it opened it had shelter for 25,000 people with an infrastructure intended for some 50,000, further expandable up to 130,000. It thus had the potential to become one of the largest refugee camps not just around Syria but in the world, perhaps only second to the Dadaab camp in Kenya. At that time Jordan already had some 600,000 registered refugees within its borders, with that country's officials saying the real number could be twice that.

== Actuality ==
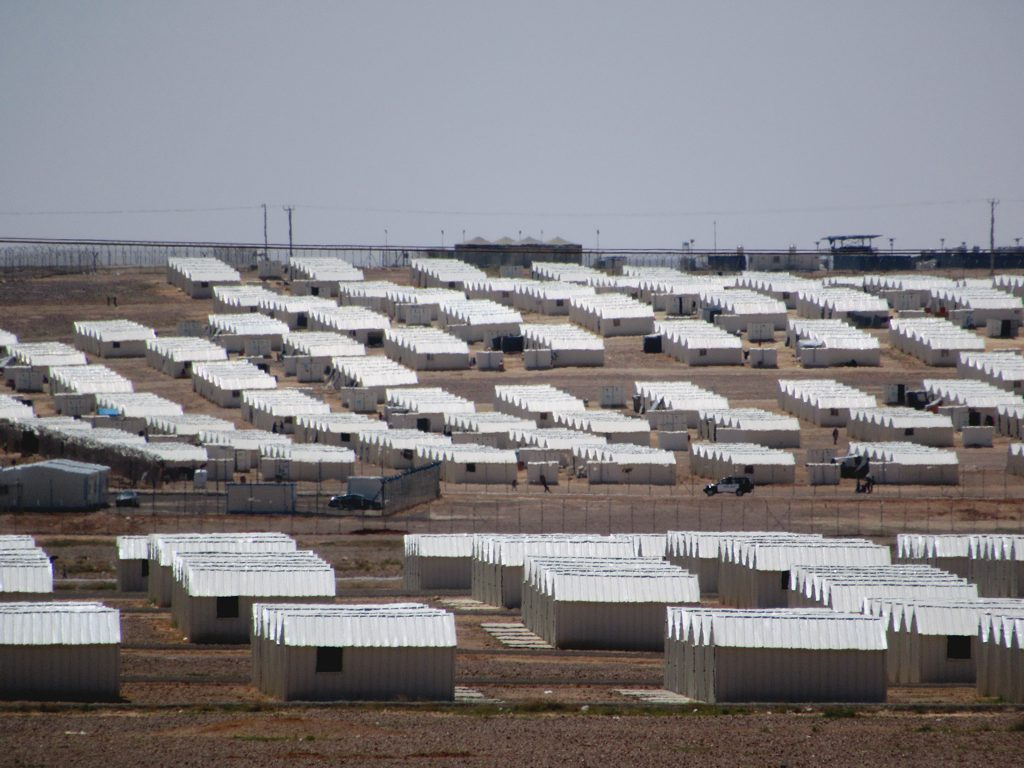
Nature of camp, March 2018

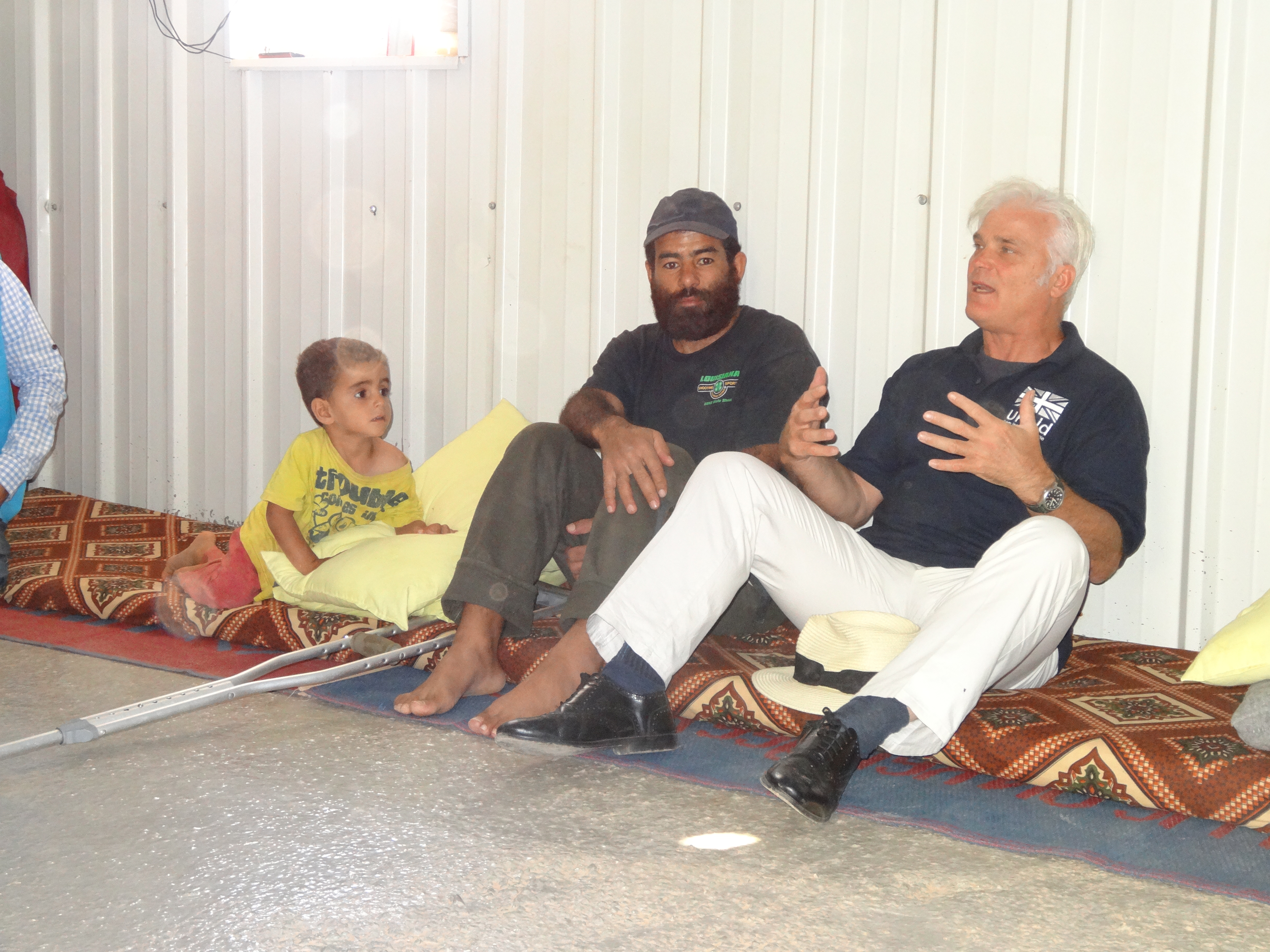
Minister Swayne talks to Syrian refugees at the camp in July 2015

Once open, the camp did not become populated to the extent expected. By March 2015 the Azraq refugee camp had only 14,500 refugees, when it had been anticipated there would be over 60,000 by then. Some of the reasons were external, such as fear of Islamic State of Iraq and the Levant fighters entering Jordan along with refugees or the Jordanian government worried about possible donor fatigue and the long-term expense of housing a refugee population. But other reasons were due to the camp itself: more than half of the 35,000 refugees who had entered the camp had already left (most would settle illegally in Jordanian towns and cities).

One early issue at the camp was the absence of electricity, due to the remoteness of the camp from other populated areas. Refugees thus had to make use of solar lanterns instead. Among other effects, this made it difficult for refugees to keep their mobile phones charged and thus stay in contact with family members outside the camp. Gradually a few generators became available. Other refugees worried about mice, snakes, and scorpions. The desolate nature of the camp worked against itself; as one elderly refugee said when he arrived with his relatives, "When I first arrived and saw the camp, I almost had a heart attack. The sense of emptiness and uncertainty overwhelmed me."

By June 2015 the Azraq refugee camp still had only around 18,500 refugees in it. The most commonly cited reasons for refugees not wanting to stay there were very hot temperatures in the summer months, continued chronic absences of electricity, and high food prices. Some refugees in the camp received permits to visit Jordanian cities and then never returned. The camp remained safe in security terms but, as a saying there went, "the only risk is that you will die from boredom." Other refugees made the best of it; a UNHCR fundraising letter profiled a 65-year-old, formerly wealthy Syrian who collected scraps of discarded materials around camp and created from them toys for camp children, thus becoming known as the "Inventor of Azraq".

As the Syrian refugee crisis attained global public awareness in late 2015, the state of the Azraq refugee camp became involved in political considerations. In November 2015, retired neurosurgeon Ben Carson visited the camp, as part of trying to bolster his foreign policy expertise during his 2016 U.S. presidential campaign. He concluded that rather than refugees coming to the United States, they should be sheltered in nearby countries in the Middle East.

Population of the camp gradually increased throughout the second half of 2015, but remained well below initial expectations. By early 2016, another problem with filling the camp were the large numbers of refugees being held up at a military-controlled area along the border with Syria where there was slow processing of them due to security and other reasons. Efforts to improve the electricity situation at the camp continued, with a 6-megawatt, $10 million solar power project underway, the first parts of which were scheduled to come online in mid-2016.

In March 2019 the Women and Girls Safe Space Centre was opened within the camp by the Danish Refugee Council. With activities including protection awareness, support groups, and recreational and financial skills training activities, it proved to be a popular resource within the camp. By then the camp's population numbered over 35,000.

Following the fall of the Assad regime in Syria, many residents expressed hope at being able to return to their home country, and a number of refugees departed the camp to return to their homes. Nevertheless, the situation has been complicated by the precarious economic and security situation in Syria, with some returning refugees expressing concern at the lack of housing or economic opportunities in the country. Because of this, the number of refugees who hoped to be able to return to Syria dropped from 68% in a poll in January 2025 to 32% by April 2025.

In July 2025 it was reported that UNICEF along with the UK's Foreign, Commonwealth & Development Office (FCDO), signed a new £1.5 million agreement, that will ensure the continuity of water supply to the refugees.

== See also ==
- List of Syrian refugee camps in Jordan
