= Donor fatigue =

Charity-related phenomenon

Donor fatigue is a phenomenon in which people no longer donate to charities, although they have in the past. On a larger scale, it can also refer to a slowness to act on the part of the international community or any other donor base in response to a humanitarian crisis or call-to-action.

== Examples ==
- TICAD was formed at a time when the international community's interest in Africa was starting to wane, and donor fatigue was setting in.
- United Nations Security Council Resolution 1087: There was slow progress in the peace process, including implementing the Lusaka Protocol. The Council approved the Secretary-General Boutros Boutros-Ghali's recommendation to reduce the size of UNAVEM III during February 1997, due to donor fatigue.

== See also ==
- AIDS fatigue, when public health messages are ignored for similar reasons
- Information fatigue
- Voter fatigue, voting apathy related to too-frequent elections
