= Election Defense Alliance =

American election integrity organization

- Formation: July 2006; 20 years ago United States
- Founder: Sally Castleman; Jonathan Simon; Dan Ashby
- Website: electiondefensealliance.org

The Election Defense Alliance (EDA) was founded in July 2006 by Sally Castleman, Jonathan Simon, and Dan Ashby. It was established as a national coordinating body to promote and support citizen activism at the local and state level, intending to restore integrity and public accountability to the electoral processes of the United States and its territories. It is intended as a forum in which election integrity work can be sponsored and monitored, and a vehicle for the general public to report election fraud, in all of its forms.

EDA was a sponsored project of the International Humanities Center (IHC), which closed in 2012.
