= Cost of Voting Index =

Ranking of how easy it is to vote by U.S. state

- Formation: 2018
- Location: United States
- Author: Scot Schraufnagel
- Author: Michael J. Pomante II
- Author: Quan Li
- Website: costofvotingindex.com

The Cost of Voting Index measures and ranks how difficult it is to vote in each state in the United States, focusing on voter registration and voting rules. The index also has rankings for every two years since 1996. The states ranked as being easier to vote also tend to have higher voter turnout.

== Component parts of the index ==
The 2022 iteration of the index has 10 categories with various criteria within each category to measure and rank each state on how easy it is to vote.

Categories	Issue area	Cost-of-voting consideration
Voter registration	#1 – Registration deadline (ratio-level)	# of days prior to the election a voter must be registered to vote
Voter registration	#2 – Voter registration restrictions (9-item additive sub-index)	Same-day registration not allowed for all elections
Voter registration	#2 – Voter registration restrictions (9-item additive sub-index)	Same-day registration not located at polling station
Voter registration	#2 – Voter registration restrictions (9-item additive sub-index)	Mental competency required for voter registration
Voter registration	#2 – Voter registration restrictions (9-item additive sub-index)	No online voter registration
Voter registration	#2 – Voter registration restrictions (9-item additive sub-index)	Same-day registration not allowed for presidential election
Voter registration	#2 – Voter registration restrictions (9-item additive sub-index)	Felons not allowed to register while incarcerated
Voter registration	#2 – Voter registration restrictions (9-item additive sub-index)	Felons not allowed to register after incarceration
Voter registration	#2 – Voter registration restrictions (9-item additive sub-index)	Online voter registration deadline greater than median
Voter registration	#2 – Voter registration restrictions (9-item additive sub-index)	Additional documents requirements beyond federal min.
Voter registration	#3 – Registration drive restrictions (4-item additive sub-index)	Official group certification required
Voter registration	#3 – Registration drive restrictions (4-item additive sub-index)	State mandated training required
Voter registration	#3 – Registration drive restrictions (4-item additive sub-index)	Group required to submit documents to state
Voter registration	#3 – Registration drive restrictions (4-item additive sub-index)	Penalty imposed for violation of deadlines or rules
Voter registration	#3 – Registration drive restrictions (4-item additive sub-index)	No registration drives allowed (scored 5)
Voter registration	#4 – Pre-registration laws (7-item ordered scale)	0 = 16-year-olds can pre-register
Voter registration	#4 – Pre-registration laws (7-item ordered scale)	1 = 17-year-olds can pre-register
Voter registration	#4 – Pre-registration laws (7-item ordered scale)	2 = 17.5-year-olds can pre-register
Voter registration	#4 – Pre-registration laws (7-item ordered scale)	3 = 90 days before 18th birthday can pre-register
Voter registration	#4 – Pre-registration laws (7-item ordered scale)	4 = 60 days before 18th birthday can pre-register
Voter registration	#4 – Pre-registration laws (7-item ordered scale)	5 = 16-year-old policy, no legal basis
Voter registration	#4 – Pre-registration laws (7-item ordered scale)	6 = no state law discusses pre-registration
Voter registration	#5 – Automatic voter registration (4-item ordered scale)	0 = citizen must opt-out "Back end AVR"
Voter registration	#5 – Automatic voter registration (4-item ordered scale)	1 = automatic registration at more than one state agency
Voter registration	#5 – Automatic voter registration (4-item ordered scale)	2 = automatic registration at DMV only
Voter registration	#5 – Automatic voter registration (4-item ordered scale)	3 = no automatic voter registration
Voting	#6 – Voting inconvenience (12-item additive sub-index)	No election-day state holiday
Voting	#6 – Voting inconvenience (12-item additive sub-index)	No early voting
Voting	#6 – Voting inconvenience (12-item additive sub-index)	No all mail voting
Voting	#6 – Voting inconvenience (12-item additive sub-index)	No voting centers
Voting	#6 – Voting inconvenience (12-item additive sub-index)	No time-off from work for voting
Voting	#6 – Voting inconvenience (12-item additive sub-index)	No time-off from work with pay for voting
Voting	#6 – Voting inconvenience (12-item additive sub-index)	Mail voting but no election-day polling option
Voting	#6 – Voting inconvenience (12-item additive sub-index)	Reduced number of polling stations post-holder
Voting	#6 – Voting inconvenience (12-item additive sub-index)	Reduced # of polling stations >50% (some areas)
Voting	#6 – Voting inconvenience (12-item additive sub-index)	Excessive election-day wait time
Voting	#6 – Voting inconvenience (12-item additive sub-index)	No postage-paid envelopes
Voting	#6 – Voting inconvenience (12-item additive sub-index)	No passing out food/water to people in line to vote
Voting	#7 – Voter ID laws (5-item ordered scale)	0 = no ID required to cast a ballot, only signature
Voting	#7 – Voter ID laws (5-item ordered scale)	1 = non-photo ID required not strictly enforced
Voting	#7 – Voter ID laws (5-item ordered scale)	2 = photo ID required not strictly enforced
Voting	#7 – Voter ID laws (5-item ordered scale)	3 = non-photo ID required strictly enforced
Voting	#7 – Voter ID laws (5-item ordered scale)	4 = photo ID required strictly enforced
Voting	#8 – Poll hours (ratio-level)	Min. and max. poll hours (averaged and reversed)
Voting	#9 – Early voting days (ratio-level)	Number of early voting days (reversed)
Voting	#10 – Absentee voting (10-item additive sub-index)	State-sanctioned excuse required to vote absentee
Voting	#10 – Absentee voting (10-item additive sub-index)	No in-person absentee voting
Voting	#10 – Absentee voting (10-item additive sub-index)	No permanent absentee status allowed
Voting	#10 – Absentee voting (10-item additive sub-index)	No online absentee application process
Voting	#10 – Absentee voting (10-item additive sub-index)	Must include copy of ID to vote absentee
Voting	#10 – Absentee voting (10-item additive sub-index)	No convenient absentee ballot drop-off locations
Voting	#10 – Absentee voting (10-item additive sub-index)	Restriction on who can return an absentee ballot
Voting	#10 – Absentee voting (10-item additive sub-index)	Restriction on timing/quantity of ballots returned
Voting	#10 – Absentee voting (10-item additive sub-index)	No 3rd-party dist. of absentee ballot applications
Voting	#10 – Absentee voting (10-item additive sub-index)	No election official distribution of absentee ballots

== Factors not in Index ==
The following factors, while not included, also influence the ease and likelihood of voting or voter suppression.

Ballot initiatives often give voters more reasons to go to the polls by offering a straightforward way to streamline their own election process by circumventing the incumbent politicians.

Ballot length: ballots with dozens and dozens of items to vote on can discourage citizens from doing the difficult research they may feel is required, spending less time researching each race.

Compulsory voting: voting is easier when >90% of citizens vote, creating positive cultural norms, establishing voting habits, and having more citizens who can help each other navigate the process.

Election frequency and timing: two-round elections, recall elections, and off-year elections all suppress voter turnout.

Gerrymandering can disincentivize voting by artificially making certain races less competitive.

Information accessibility and press freedom: information warfare, support for public or nonprofit media, and transparency in government operations all influence the ease of voting and trust of voting systems through enhanced election security. 2/3 of U.S. college students cited a lack of information as a reason for why they didn't vote.

Party membership requirements: requiring voters to register with a party makes voting more complex and difficult, especially for those people who don't identify with the party that is likely to win the seat in the general election.

Purges of voter rolls: the act of unregistering voters by sending postcards requiring what amounts to re-registration or employing a 'use it or lose it' approach where after a certain number of elections of not voting, voters are automatically removed from the voter rolls without any evidence that they have moved.

Threats and voter intimidation: Intimidation can result from the presence of cameras or guns at polling places to ballots that may not be secret. Following-through on threats by physically harming or killing people can severely deter voter participation.

Voter enfranchisement: voting starting at the age of 16 helps the learning process of how to vote, and simplicity with regard to felony enfranchisement also makes voting simpler.

Voter verification: a substantial match standard for signatures on mail-in ballots, for example, makes it less likely for valid votes to be destroyed than in a system with an "exact match" standard, without any evidence of an increase in fraud. Many states in the U.S., for example, also allow voters to remedy ballots where the signatures seem too different. Other sources of complications arise from issues in matching data from different databases where discrepancies could arise for lots of reasons for those with the right to vote.

== See also ==
- State constitutions in the United States
- Votebeat
- Voter fatigue
- Voter suppression
- Voter suppression in the United States
