= Voter suppression =

Strategy designed to restrict specific groups of people from voting

Voter suppression is the effort to limit the capacity of a group to register, vote, or cast an effective ballot. It is distinguished from political campaigning in that campaigning attempts to change likely voting behavior by changing the opinions of potential voters through persuasion and organization, activating otherwise inactive voters, or registering new supporters. Voter suppression, instead, attempts to gain an advantage by reducing the turnout of certain voters. Suppression is an anti-democratic tactic associated with authoritarianism.

The tactics of voter suppression range from changes that increase voter fatigue, to intimidating or harming prospective voters.

== Impact ==
Some argue the term "voter suppression" downplays the harm done when voices are not reflected in an election, calling for terms like "vote destruction" that accounts for the permanence of each vote not being cast. Making it harder to vote for people who have been given the right can lead to voter fatigue. Skewing the electorate jeopardizes the wisdom of the crowd and the decision-making benefits it brings. Suppression does not require intent. Analyzing the turnout of eligible voters provides a partial way to study cumulative voter suppression impacts under specific conditions, though other avenues such as election subversion, gerrymandering, and corruption, cannot always be captured by voter turnout metrics. Additionally, some of the rules that end up suppressing votes can also be used as a pretext for throwing out votes, even when voter fraud is extremely rare.

== By type ==
=== Ballot design ===
A half-million Americans had their votes disqualified in 2008 and 2010 due to ballot design issues, including confusing instructions. The order of politicians on the ballot can also give one candidate an edge, while the length of a ballot can overwhelm voters, pushing them from the electorate for some or all races and increasing the wait times in lines for in-person voters.

=== Day-of experience ===
Requiring people to travel long distances and/or wait in long lines, for example, suppresses voter turnout. Some parties in Europe that have less support among expats have made it much more difficult for them to cast ballots by removing vote by mail options, forcing some to travel hundreds of kilometers.

Weekend (such as Saturday voting in Australia) also contributes to higher turnout than weekday voting, maybe even more than having Election Day as a recognized holiday. A study in the UK found that when the sun sets later in the day, turnout tends to improve. In some countries (such as Czechia) elections are held over two or more days.

The Cost of Voting Index estimates how much more difficult the voting experience is on average in states around the U.S. 78% of respondents in one preferred vote-by-mail to voting in-person.

=== Frequent elections ===
Frequent elections increase the amount of time and attention required of voters, typically leading to lower turnout among certain types of voters. Two-round elections (including primary elections), recall elections, and off-year elections are some examples of elections that contribute to voter fatigue. For example, Japan, Switzerland and the United States have the lowest voter turnout rates among developed countries due to holding frequent elections.

=== Identification ===
Unaffordable voter identification can suppress voting, while free voter identification does not put significant burden on voters. This is not an issue in countries that issue ID cards showing citizenship status to all citizens.

=== Information warfare ===
Misinformation, disinformation, and the platforms that are incentivized to boost half-truths and lies are forms of information warfare that can be used to confuse, intimidate, or deceive voters. When misinformation and disinformation is amplified by the laundering of foreign money through domestic nonprofit organizations or other allied domestic actors, charges of treason can be brought against these actors for colluding with a foreign power.

Common examples include undermining journalism, academia, political speech and other fundamental exchanges of ideas and information. Free or low-cost sources of information, such as through libraries, schools, nonprofits, public media, or open-source projects (like Wikipedia), have historically supported this key democratic prerequisite. For example, two-thirds of U.S. college students in one study cited a lack of information as a reason for why they did not vote.

=== Intimidation and violence ===
Intimidation can result from the presence of cameras or guns at polling places to ballots that may not be secret. Following-through on threats by physically harming or killing people can severely deter voter participation.

=== Registration or enrollment ===
Voter registration (or enrollment) is an extra step in the election process creates extra work for voters, especially those who move often and are new to the system, thereby suppressing their votes. Registration has been the number one reason why citizens in the US do not vote, which is why most democracies automatically enroll their citizens. Same-day registration is another tool to make registration less of a barrier. In addition, the existence of the process itself opens up more opportunities to make the process intentionally difficult or impossible, including aggressive voter roll purges. The Cost of Voting Index quantifies some of the differences in voter registration experiences in US states.

==== Party membership requirements ====
Another example where registration can suppress votes is requiring a declared party preference, which is required in closed primaries in the United States for example, dissuading voters who do not want to declare a party preference in order to weigh-in on who represents them. Open primaries allow anyone to vote regardless of party preference or affiliation. In some more authoritarian states, loyal party membership may be required to have a say, or even basic rights and privileges.

=== Voter apathy ===
Voters may be discouraged from voting by weak cultural norms around voting. Countries without universal voting signal that voting is unimportant. A voting culture can be developed by reinforcing how voting is valued, expected and a centerpiece of a place's culture, as peer pressure and a sense of belonging are powerful incentives to do something collectively.

Some proposals for reform include requiring that every selection have a "none of the above" option, allow a wide range of valid excuses for not voting for conscientious objectors, and charging a low, non-compounding, non-criminal fee for those who do not vote or select a valid reason.

=== Wasted votes ===
Winner-take-all systems (unlike in systems with proportional representation) are especially vulnerable to wasting certain votes. This phenomenon also suppresses turnout for that and other elections help simultaneously in states that are not competitive, suppressing the popular vote for president in the US, for example, while lowering turnout in a host of other contests. In contrast, a parliamentary system typically significantly reduces wasted (suppressed) votes, helping to ensure more vote equality and encouraging greater overall participation.

Ballot referendum can also be a powerful avenue for changing political systems, for example, that are not as responsive to voters due to gerrymandering or other anti-democratic actions and policies.

== By country ==
=== Australia ===
Australian citizens are expected to enroll to vote, and it is their responsibility to update their enrollment when they change their address. Even so, an estimated 6% of eligible Australian voters are not enrolled or are enrolled incorrectly. They are disproportionately younger voters, many of whom might neglect to enroll when they attain voting age.

In 2006, the Howard government legislated to close the electoral roll much earlier once an election was called than before. Previously, voters had been allowed seven days of grace after an election had been called to arrange or update their enrollment, but new voters were now allowed only until 8:00 p.m. on the day that the electoral writ was issued to lodge their enrollment form, and those who needed to update their addresses were allowed three days. In Australia, the Prime Minister effectively has the right to determine the date of the election as long as constitutional rules regarding the maximum term of the parliament are adhered to. That measure was therefore likely to result in many newer voters being precluded from voting in the first election for which they were eligible because the time to arrange their enrollment once an election is called had been greatly reduced.

The measure was widely seen as an attempt at voter suppression aimed at younger voters since surveys had shown that younger voters are more likely than the general population to vote for the Australian Labor Party or the Greens than Howard's Liberal Party. The government denied that it was trying to suppress some voters and insisted that the purposes of the reform were a smoother administration of the elections and the reduction of the possibility of electoral fraud. However, the Australian Electoral Commission had requested no such reform, there had been no evidence of significant electoral fraud, and the Australian Electoral Commission had been dealing with hundreds of thousands of late enrollments without significant problems for decades.

In July 2010, the left-wing lobby group GetUp! launched a challenge to the law. The High Court of Australia expedited the hearing so that a ruling could be made in time for the 2010 federal election. The majority ruling struck down early closing of the roll and reinstated the old rule allowing voters seven days grace to arrange or update their enrollment.

=== Brazil ===
In the 2022 Brazilian general election, there were attempts by police and political sympathisers to make it more difficult for lower-income people to attend polling stations. Some public transport services were temporary reduced, spot inspections of vehicles and public transport were increased in poorer areas of the country, and roadblocks set up to disrupt and delay traffic.

=== Canada ===
Shortly before the 2011 Canadian federal election, voter suppression tactics were exercised by issuing robocalls and live calls, which falsely advised voters that their polling station had been changed. The locations offered by those messages were intentionally false, often led voters several hours from the correct stations, and often identified themselves illegally as coming from Elections Canada. In litigation brought by the Council of Canadians, a federal court found that such fraud had occurred and had probably been perpetrated by someone with access to the Conservative Party's voter database, including its information about voter preferences. The court stated that the evidence did not prove that the Conservative Party or that its successful candidates had been directly involved, but it criticized the Conservative Party for making "little effort to assist with the investigation." The court did not annul the result in any of six ridings where the fraud had occurred because it concluded that the number of votes affected had been too small to change the outcome.

=== France ===
In France, as in some other countries with Voter Registration, requirements and processes to update your address suppress voter turnout disproportionately against people who move more often, who tend to be younger, for example.

=== Israel ===
In April 2019, during Israel's general elections for the 21st Knesset, Likud activists installed hidden cameras in polling stations in Arab communities. Election observers were seen wearing such cameras. Hanan Melcer, the Head of the General Elections Committee, called the cameras illegal. The following day, the public relations agency Kaizler Inbar took credit for the operation and said it had been planned in collaboration with Likud. It claimed that voter turnout in Arab communities had fallen under 50% by the presence of the agency's observers in the polling stations, though some of this decrease is likely due to a boycott that was planned for the vote.

=== United Kingdom ===
Lutfur Rahman was the directly-elected mayor of Tower Hamlets for the British Labour Party. He was removed from office after being convicted of breaches of electoral law when his supporters intimidated voters at polling stations.

=== United States ===
In the United States, elections are administered locally (though with many election rules set by states and the federal government), and forms of voter suppression vary among jurisdictions. When the country was founded, the right to vote in most states was limited to property-owning white males. Over time, the right to vote was granted to racial minorities, women, and youth.

In the late 19th and the early 20th centuries, Southern states passed Jim Crow laws to suppress poor and racial minority voters that involved poll taxes, literacy tests, and grandfather clauses. Most of those voter suppression tactics were made illegal after the enactment of the Voting Rights Act of 1965. Even after the repeal of those statutes, there have been repeated incidents of racial discrimination against voters, especially in the South. For example, 87,000 people in Georgia were unable to vote in 2018 because of late registration. Many of the strictest voting regulations are in swing states and have been enacted primarily by U.S. Republican Party politicians. According to AMP Reports, many people who were predicted to be in favor of voting for the U.S. Democratic Party had their ballot dismissed. The study's analysis noted: "A disproportionate number of those potential voters were people of color or young voters, groups that typically favor Democrats." The history of the previous Jim Crow regulations in the Southern states affects the voter suppression today because minorities often have their vote dismissed by the manipulation of voting regulations.

One analysis of a Florida election in 2012 found that >200,000 people did not vote because of long lines. Some Floridians were forced to wait 6–7 hours to vote.

In 2013, after the U.S. Supreme Court struck down Section 4 of the Voting Rights Act, several states enacted voter ID laws. Some argue that such laws amount to voter suppression against African-Americans.

In Texas, a voter ID law requiring a driver's license, passport, military identification, or gun permit was repeatedly found to be intentionally discriminatory. However, the DOJ expressed support for Texas's ID law. A similar ID law in North Dakota, which would have disenfranchised many Native Americans, was also overturned.

In Wisconsin, a federal judge found that the state's restrictive voter ID law had led to "real incidents of disenfranchisement, which undermine rather than enhance confidence in elections, particularly in minority communities". Since there was no evidence of widespread voter impersonation in Wisconsin, it found that the law was "a cure worse than the disease". In addition to imposing strict voter ID requirements, the law reduced early voting, required people to live in a ward for at least 28 days before voting, and prohibited emailing absentee ballots to voters.

Other controversial measures include shutting down Department of Motor Vehicles (DMV) offices in minority neighborhoods, which makes it more difficult for residents to obtain voter IDs; shutting down polling places in minority neighborhoods; systematically depriving precincts in minority neighborhoods of the resources needed to operate efficiently, such as poll workers and voting machines; and purging voters from the rolls shortly before an election.

Often, voter fraud is cited as a justification for such laws even if the incidence is low. In Iowa, lawmakers passed a strict voter ID law with the potential to disenfranchise 260,000 voters. Out of 1.6 million votes cast in Iowa in 2016, there were only 10 allegations of voter fraud, none of which being cases of impersonation that a voter ID law could have prevented. Iowa Secretary of State Paul Pate, the architect of the bill, stated "we've not experienced widespread voter fraud in Iowa".

In May 2017, US President Donald Trump established the Presidential Advisory Commission on Election Integrity for the purpose of preventing voter fraud. Critics have suggested that its true purpose is voter suppression. The commission was led by Kansas Secretary of State Kris Kobach, a staunch advocate of strict voter ID laws and a proponent of the Crosscheck system. Crosscheck is a national database, which is designed to check for voters who are registered in more than one state by comparing names and dates of birth. Researchers at Stanford University, the University of Pennsylvania, Harvard University, and Microsoft found that for every legitimate instance of double registration it finds, Crosscheck's algorithm returns approximately 200 false positives. Kobach has been repeatedly sued by the American Civil Liberties Union (ACLU) for trying to restrict voting rights in Kansas.

Photo identification requirements may suppress some voters, which may disproportionately affect the young, lower-income people, lesser educated people, Hispanic people, and younger white people. The Center for Democracy and Civic Engagement at The University of Maryland estimates that 15% of adult American either lack driver's licenses or state IDs or have IDs that may not meet strict photo ID voting law requirements. The American Civil Liberties Union has argued that the implementation of signature-matching processes for mail-in ballots can suppress voters, especially people with disabilities, trans- and gender-nonconforming people, recently married women, people for whom English is a second language, and military personnel.

== See also ==
- Authoritarianism
- Democratic backsliding
- Election interference
- Electoral fraud
- Gerrymandering
- Hybrid regime
- Oppression
- Political repression
- Voter caging
- Vote equality
- Unfair election
