= United Nations Security Council Resolution 1087 =

UN Security Council Resolution 1087
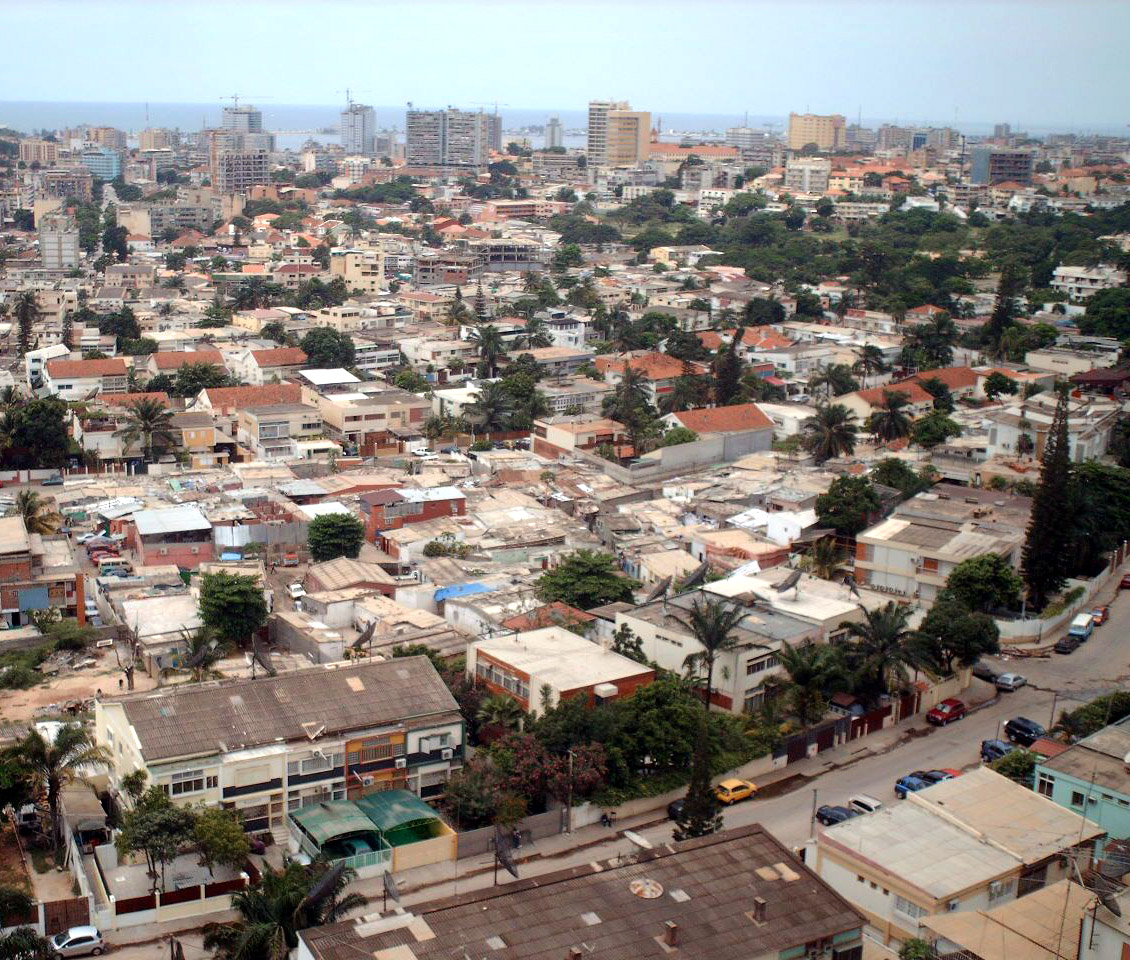
- Luanda, capital of Angola
- Date: 11 December 1996
- Meeting no.: 3,722
- Code: S/RES/1087 (Document)
- Subject: The situation in Angola
- Voting summary: 15 voted for; None voted against; None abstained
- Result: Adopted

Security Council composition
- Permanent members: China; France; Russia; United Kingdom; United States
- Non-permanent members: Botswana; Chile; Egypt; Guinea-Bissau; Germany; Honduras; Indonesia; Italy; South Korea; Poland

United Nations Security Council resolution 1087, adopted unanimously on 11 December 1996, after reaffirming Resolution 696 (1991) and all subsequent resolutions on Angola, extended the mandate of the United Nations Angola Verification Mission III (UNAVEM III) until 28 February 1997.

The importance of full implementation of the peace agreements, including the Lusaka Protocol, for Angola was emphasised, and all parties were reminded of their obligations.

There was slow progress in the peace process. The Council approved the Secretary-General Boutros Boutros-Ghali's recommendation to reduce the size of UNAVEM III during February 1997, due to donor fatigue. The two parties also had to start working on the integration of selected UNITA troops into the Angolan army and demobilisation. The parties also had to reach an agreement on the special status of the President of UNITA as the President of the largest opposition party before 31 December 1996. They were asked to travel to Luanda on the formation of a government of national unity and reconciliation. The arms embargo against UNITA, imposed in Resolution 864 (1993), had to be strictly enforced and concern was expressed that neighbouring states were not enforcing it.

Both parties were then called upon to intensify demining efforts and destroy stockpiles of land mines which would be monitored by UNAVEM III. Finally, the Secretary-General was requested to prepare for a follow-on United Nations presence in Angola which would include military observers, police observers, a political component, human rights monitors and a Special Representative, reporting back no later than 10 February 1997.

== See also ==
- Angolan Civil War
- List of United Nations Security Council Resolutions 1001 to 1100 (1995–1997)
- MONUA
- United Nations Angola Verification Mission I
- United Nations Angola Verification Mission II
