= Stunning elections =

Stunning elections are a process of democratization in authoritarian or hybrid regimes through partially free elections in which the opposition either wins, or forms a majority in parliament and begins to significantly influence the decision-making process.

The hybrid regime may hold a clean election if the ruling elites are confident in their popularity. Usually, the return of some democratic institutions by an autocrat is done in order to increase the ruler's legitimacy, including international respect. However, an underestimation of the risks (caused by broken feedback mechanisms) may result in unexpected outcomes.

Samuel P. Huntington linked the term stunning election to the situation in which an autocrat-organized election, produces an unexpectedly bad outcome.

Paul Pierson noted that in developed democracies, candidates often change their rhetoric depending on the tactics and preferred audience of their opponents. He also noted that voters changing their behavior in such a way as not to "waste" their vote on a popular, but impassable candidate, leads to unplanned heterogeneity in the election results, especially in conditions of pluralism. Andreas Schedler in the footsteps of George Tsebelis argued that even if the results of the overturning elections are not recognized by the ruling elites (stolen elections), street protests may lead to a regime change through democratization-by-election.

== List of stunning elections ==
=== Stunning election that led to government changes ===
- 2026 Hungarian parliamentary election
- 2026 Serbian parliamentary election
- 2020 Montenegrin parliamentary election
- 2018 Malaysian general election
- 2004 Ukrainian presidential election
- 2003 Georgian parliamentary election
- 2000 Yugoslavian general election
- 1989 Polish parliamentary election
- 1988 Chilean presidential referendum
- 1986 Philippine presidential election
- 1931 Spanish local elections

=== Stunning elections that failed to achieve government changes ===
- 2024 Georgian parliamentary election
- 2024 Venezuelan presidential election
- 2020 Belarusian presidential election
