= Election interference =

An 1839 speech by William H. Roane of Virginia regarding a bill on election interference by federal officials, readable pdf

Election interference generally refers to efforts to change the outcome of an election, especially by illegitimate means. Kinds of election interference may include:

- Electoral fraud, illegal interference with the process of an election
  - Vote buying, when a political party or candidate distributes money to a voter with the expectation that they will vote for them
  - Voter impersonation, when an eligible voter votes more than once or a non-eligible voter votes under the name of an eligible one
- Foreign electoral intervention, attempts by governments to influence elections in another country:
  - Russian interference in the 2016 United States elections
  - Chinese government interference in the 2019 and 2021 Canadian federal elections
  - Russian interference in the 2020 United States elections
  - Russian interference in the 2024 United States elections
  - American interference in 81 elections in at least 19 different countries between 1946-2000.
- Illegal electioneering, such as campaigning or wearing political apparel too close to a polling place
- Recruiting candidates with identical or similar names to an existing one, intended to confuse voters
- Where prohibited, the use of public funds to persuade voters to vote in a certain way

== See also ==
- List of foreign electoral interventions
- Artificial intelligence and elections
- Election audit, a review conducted to determine whether votes were counted accurately or whether proper procedures were followed
- Election denial, the baseless rejection of election results
- Election security, the protection of elections and voting infrastructure from cyberattack or cyber threat
- Election subversion, changing the result of a legitimate election outcome
- Lawfare
