= Voter fatigue =

Cause of lower voter participation

In political science, voter fatigue is a cause of voter abstention which result from the electorates of representative democracies being asked to vote often, on too many issues or without easy access to relevant information. Voter fatigue can be a symptom of efforts that make voting more difficult that some describe as voter suppression, which changes the voting rules and environment in such a way that turnout decreases as the cost of voting increases.

== Causes ==
According to the traditional understanding of the concept, voter fatigue arises when citizens are asked to vote frequently or fill out lengthy ballots. Voter fatigue can be contributed to by a psychological phenomenon known as decision fatigue. As this suggests, our brain becomes mentally fatigued after making numerous decisions, so it will attempt to make shortcuts to decrease the workload. As decision fatigue increases, more voters abstain. This can result in lower voter turnout rates.

The process of voting can also be confusing or challenging. In the U.S., the Cost of Voting Index estimates how difficult it is to vote (and register to vote) in each state. The index doesn't include other challenges like voter roll purges or such if signature verification standards are so strict that they throw out many more valid votes than invalid ones, with some states requiring residents to 'cure' their ballots by re-signing.

== Combating voter fatigue ==
Some of the methods proposed to combat voter fatigue include:

- Consolidate the number of elections, especially off-year elections.
- Guard against long and complex ballots.
- Use sortition (e.g. citizens' juries) instead of elections for some decisions.
- Make voting easier, including the process of finding civic information.
- Experiment with incorporating aspects of E-democracy, proxy voting and delegated voting.

== Examples ==
In the run-up to the 2019 UK General Election, it was suggested by some media outlets that the electorate might be altered by abstention from voter fatigue from the third general election in little over 4 years, having seen one in 2015 and the snap election of 2017, either side of the 2016 EU Membership Referendum.

In Israel, five snap elections from 2019-2022 has led to concerns about voter fatigue.

Amid the Bulgarian political crisis, reports by the Parliamentary Assembly of the Council of Europe, Balkan Insight, and Euronews described the voter fatigue faced by Bulgarian voters having to vote six times in three years.

== See also ==
- Donor fatigue, increased apathy about giving to charitable or humanitarian causes
- Political apathy
