= Unfair election =

Election with coercion or fraud

An unfair election identifies when an election is not free and fair. Unfair elections violate one or more of the characteristics of free and fair elections. A free and fair election has the following characteristics:

- Equal voting rights, without unreasonable restrictions
- Freedom of association for political groups and right to be a candidate
- Parity of resources among political groups to persuade
- An informed debate, with equal opportunity to express a view (political freedom of press)
- The government's power is not unduly curtailed by the constitution or international agreements
- The elected government can take legislative action to enact its promises
- Electoral Commission that ensures a free and fair election
- Voting system that comes close to ensuring all votes count equally

== Unfair practices ==
=== Limited ballot access ===
- Unreasonably difficult nomination rules, where it is seen as too difficult for some parties to get on the ballot, such as political censorship
- Undemocratic banning of political parties

=== Issues with One Person One Vote ===
- When all votes don't count equally, such as gerrymandering (in first-past-the-post voting), wasted votes or vote splitting

=== Limited media access ===
Electoral choices may be influenced by processes of social influence, conformity, social emotions, and cognitive biases. For this reason, democratic legal systems require broad media access, so that the voter's decision may be as autonomous and informed as possible. In order to safeguard the freedom, secrecy, and authenticity of the vote, it has to be avoided:

- Campaign finance rules that give one group significantly more speech than others
- Significant media bias and a high concentration of media ownership
- State media that has been captured by a group.

== History ==
Although some form of elections have been held since antiquity, in every society until 1893, large number of people were excluded based on their status, particularly slaves, poor, women, people with different skin colour, and people without formal education. The first democratic election in the modern sense was the 1893 general election in New Zealand, when women won the vote at the age of 21 like men, property qualifications were scrapped, and restrictions on Maori people voting were discarded. In the United Kingdom, some form of representation in government had been guaranteed since Magna Carta, but only for a tiny elite, and potentially vetoed by the Monarch. The Monarch's power was eliminated following the Glorious Revolution 1688, and then elections became progressively more democratic. As property qualifications were slowly phased out from 1832 to in 1918, women's suffrage became non-discriminatory in 1928, and the last vestiges of double voting were abolished in 1948. In the United States, elections for the Federal government were administered in each of the states. Around half of all successful constitutional amendments since the Revolution of 1776 concerned elections and the franchise. Slavery was abolished in 1865, universal suffrage for men in the United States House of Representatives was achieved over 1868 and 1870, direct elections to the Senate secured in 1913, women won the vote in 1920, and poll taxes levied by the states were banned in 1964. Around continental Europe, there were different speeds of progress. France had granted universal suffrage for men after the Revolutions of 1848, but did not extend the vote to women until 1944. In the German Empire, representatives at the national level were elected by universal, equal and secret manhood suffrage as of 1871, although some individual states, most notably Prussia, had more restrictive franchises for their local representative bodies. After the First World War, the new Weimar Republic's constitution of 1919 guaranteed true universal suffrage, giving women the right to vote for the first time. German democracy was abolished in 1933 by the Nazi regime and not restored until after the victory of the Allies in World War II (in the west), or German Reunification (in the east).

Article 21
1. Everyone has the right to take part in the government of his country, directly or through freely chosen representatives.
2. Everyone has the right of equal access to public service in his country.
3. The will of the people shall be the basis of the authority of government; this will shall be expressed in periodic and genuine elections which shall be by universal and equal suffrage and shall be held by secret vote or by equivalent free voting procedures.

— Universal Declaration of Human Rights 1948, article 21

In 1948, the Universal Declaration of Human Rights exhorted that "everyone has the right to take part in the government", that "the will of the people is the basis of the authority of government" and that "this will shall be expressed in periodic and genuine elections." In the post war process of decolonialisation, more and more countries became independent from the crumbling European Empires, and many introduced elections of some form, though many countries' transition slid abruptly back into authoritarian regimes. The Soviet Union and countries behind the Iron Curtain had no free elections, until the fall of the Berlin Wall in 1989. After that a majority of countries around the world have moved toward democratic electoral systems, at least on paper.

Aside from simply denying the vote by outright discrimination, or by curtailing the power of the democratically elected body, interest groups or governments seeking to usurp or hold onto power employed a variety of methods. An early case of electoral fraud was in an election to the county of Northamptonshire in England in 1768, when three earls spent more than £100,000 each to buy votes from voters to win their seats. Voter intimidation was widespread in the March 1933 German federal election, immediately before the Nazi party abolished Parliament's powers. Hitler had become Chancellor at the start of 1933 in a coalition agreement, and with control over the police, opposition party members and campaigners were beaten up and imprisoned throughout the voting process. As electoral systems became more mature, the focus of unfairness turned toward campaign finance and media bias. Almost every country in the developed world introduced limits on the amount that could be spent by any particular candidate in an election. The large exception was the United States, because a majority of judges on the US Supreme Court who were appointed by the Republican Party continued to strike down campaign finance limits as unconstitutional from 1976. A majority of countries also have some form of media regulation, so that news coverage has to be impartial and accurate in its treatment of political issues. Regulation may also extend to who owns news and television organisations, so that the power to grant access information channels is not unduly limited.

== Select examples ==
Below is a small fraction of the examples widely considered by observers to be unfair (excluding uncontested elections).

=== Afghanistan ===
- 2009: Hamid Karzai was the most popular candidate, despite winning just under half of the vote. However, there were widespread claims of electoral fraud.

=== Azerbaijan ===
Under Ilham Aliyev, elections in Azerbaijan are not free or fair according to most international observers.

- 2018: Aliyev won over 86% of the vote undemocratically.

=== Belarus ===
International reactions to Lukashenko's re-election in 2020: Belarus Congratulated Lukashenko/recognised result Recognised Tsikhanouskaya as winner Expressed concern or criticism/denied result No reaction

Under Alexander Lukashenko, The elections in Belarus have been deemed unfair. The only Belarusian election deemed free and fair was the 1994 Belarusian presidential election, the first election in the country since the dissolution of the Soviet Union in 1991.

- 2001: Lukashenko won over 77% of the vote undemocratically.
- 2006: Lukashenko won over 84% of the vote undemocratically.
- 2010: Lukashenko won over 80% of the vote undemocratically. He was congratulated for his re-election by China, Russia, Syria and Vietnam. The European Union and the United States issued a travel ban for Lukashenko.
- 2015: Lukashenko won over 84% of the vote undemocratically.
- 2020: Lukashenko won over 81% of the vote. This election was considered unfair by most international observers. Lukashenko received congratulations from the following countries: Armenia, Azerbaijan, Burundi, China, Cuba, Eritrea, Kazakhstan, Kyrgyzstan, Moldova (then under President Igor Dodon), Myanmar, Nicaragua, North Korea, Oman, Russia, Syria, Tajikistan, Turkey, Uzbekistan, Venezuela and Vietnam, as well as the partially-recognised states of Abkhazia and South Ossetia. The election result was not accepted by the following countries: Albania, Australia, Austria, Belgium, Bosnia and Herzegovina, Bulgaria, Canada, Croatia, the Czech Republic, Denmark, Estonia, Finland, France, Germany, Greece, Hungary, Ireland, Italy, Latvia, Lithuania, Luxembourg, Montenegro, the Netherlands, North Macedonia, Poland, Portugal, Romania, Serbia, Slovakia, Slovenia, Spain, Sweden, the United Kingdom and the United States. Iceland, Japan, Norway and Ukraine questioned the legitimacy of the elections, while Afghanistan, Argentina, Bolivia, Brazil, Chile, Costa Rica, Fiji, Ghana, Israel, the Marshall Islands, Mexico, Micronesia, Monaco, New Zealand, Peru, San Marino, South Korea, Switzerland and Uruguay criticised the government's response to the election.
- 2025: Lukashenko won nearly 87% of the vote undemocratically.

=== China ===
- 1923: The Zhili clique, led by Cao Kun, won over 80% of the vote undemocratically.

=== Equatorial Guinea ===
- 2022: The Democratic Party of Equatorial Guinea, led by Teodoro Obiang Nguema Mbasogo, won over 95% of the vote undemocratically.

=== Georgia ===
- 2024: The Georgian Dream, led by Irakli Kobakhidze, won over 53% of the vote undemocratically. President Salome Zourabichvili refused to recognize the official results, describing them "illegitimate".

=== Hungary ===
- 1947: The Hungarian Communist Party, led by Mátyás Rákosi, won over 20% of the vote undemocratically.
- 2010–2026: Orban's government, for example, used a voter suppression tactic for those living outside of the country by making citizens living in countries where he had less support travel many miles and wait in long lines to cast a ballot. The Government also uses state resources, including state media, to campaign year-round, while opposition parties are heavily limited in their campaigning.

=== India ===
==== Regional elections ====
- 1987 (Jammu and Kashmir): The Jammu & Kashmir National Conference, led by Farooq Abdullah, won the election, however there were widespread claims of electoral fraud.

=== Iran ===
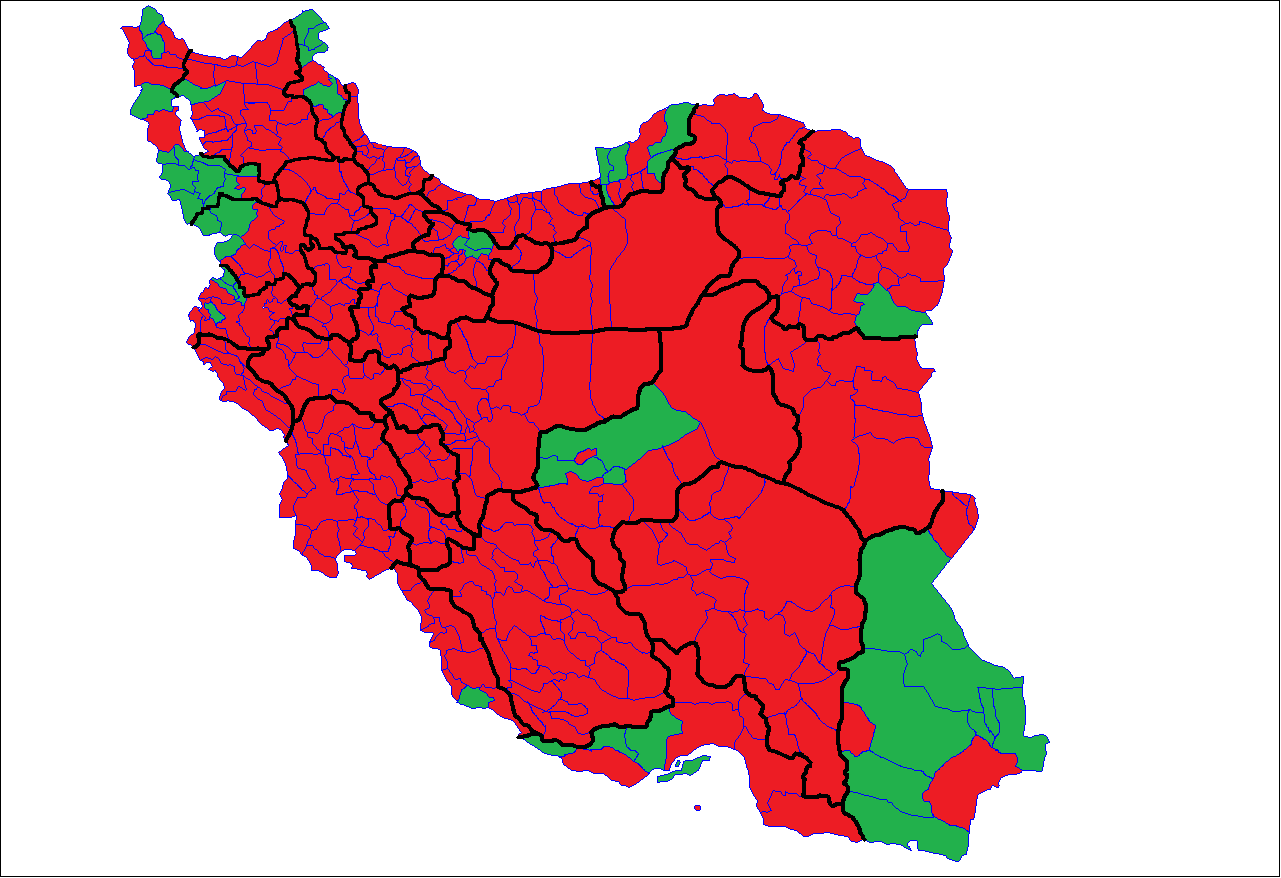
Map showing the votes of the candidates per districts/provinces (reported by Iranian government). Green districts voted for Mousavi and Red districts voted for Ahmadinejad.

Most elections that have been held in Iran have been considered unfair.

- 2009: The Alliance of Builders of Islamic Iran, led by Mahmoud Ahmadinejad, won over 60% of the vote undemocratically, resulting in global condemnation and protests.

=== Kazakhstan ===
- 1991: Nursultan Nazarbayev won over 98% of the vote undemocratically.
- 2019: Kassym-Jomart Tokayev won over 70% of the vote undemocratically.

=== Liberia ===
- 1927: Charles D. B. King won over 96% of the vote in an extreme example of a sham election.

=== Mexico ===
- 1929: The Institutional Revolutionary Party, led by Pascual Ortiz Rubio, won over 90% of the vote undemocratically.
- All other elections from 1929 to 1982.

=== Nazi Germany ===
- 1933: The Nazi Party, led by Adolf Hitler, used violent practices against leftists. Hitler eventually won the vote and rose to power, and all subsequent elections and referendums held under the Nazi regime were sham elections.

=== Pakistan ===
- 1990: The Pakistan Muslim League, led by Nawaz Sharif, won over 35% of the vote, however allegations of electoral fraud were widespread. The Supreme Court of Pakistan later ruled that the elections were rigged.

=== Philippines ===
- The 1986 Philippine presidential election was widely considered to be fraudulent on the part of Ferdinand Marcos: the Commission on Elections (COMELEC) claimed that Marcos won the election with 53.62% of the vote, but the National Citizens' Movement for Free Elections (NAMFREL) claimed that Corazon Aquino received more votes than Marcos. The ensuing turmoil resulted in the People Power Revolution, the collapse of the presidency of Ferdinand Marcos, and the accession of Aquino as president.

=== Poland ===
- 1947: The communist Front of National Unity, led by Bolesław Bierut, used violence and other tactics to subvert the election to win over 80% of the vote by a landslide victory.
- 2023: The ruling PiS party, for example, had captured Poland's public media, turning it into state media that only disseminated messages of the ruling party ahead of an election that saw hours-long lines at many voting centers where more votes for the opposition were being cast.

=== Portugal ===
- 1958: The National Union, led by Americo Thomaz, won over 75% of the vote. There were many reports of electoral fraud.

=== Romania ===
- 1946: The Ploughmen's Front, led by Petru Groza, won almost 70% of the vote undemocratically.

=== Russia ===
- 2018: Vladimir Putin won over 75% of the vote, though leading opposition figure Alexei Navalny, for example, was barred from running by Putin's government. Also, due to the Russian annexation of Crimea in 2014, many Western countries did not recognise the results of the election in Crimea.

=== Syria ===
Under Bashar al-Assad, elections in Syria are not free or fair according to most international observers.

- 2014: Al-Assad won over 90% of the vote undemocratically.
- 2021: Al-Assad won over 95% of the vote undemocratically.

=== Turkey ===
- June 2015: See electoral fraud and violence during the June 2015 Turkish general election.

=== Ukraine ===
- 2004: Viktor Yushchenko won over half of the vote, but allegations of electoral fraud in favour of his rival Viktor Yanukovych were widespread: the Supreme Court of Ukraine later ruled that the elections were rigged in favour of Yanukovych.

=== Venezuela ===
Map of countries which recognized Venezuela's 2018 presidential election: Venezuela Recognize Do not recognize Not stated

Map showing the recognition of Maduro as the winner of the 2024 Venezuelan presidential election: Venezuela Recognise Do not recognise Not stated

- 1957: Dictator Marcos Pérez Jiménez announced a referendum, without new elections, asking voters if they would approve that he remained in power.
- 2018: Incumbent President Nicolás Maduro was declared the winner of the election, although this is widely disputed and considered undemocratic by many countries. Most of the Western world recognised the social democratic Guadió-led National Assembly over Maduro's socialist regime.
- 2024: Incumbent president Nicolás Maduro was declared the winner of the election, although that election was confirmed to be seen as unfair and stolen and rigged with Opposition candidate Edmundo González and his supporters installing Poll watchers in 82% of the Voting stations to reveal the real results of the 2024 election and the poll watchers revealed that 67% of Voters voted for González while 30% of Voters voted for Maduro.

== See also ==
- Democracy indices
- List of next general elections
