= Election subversion =

Changing the result of a legitimate election outcome

Election subversion can involve a range of measures to change the outcome of a vote, including voter suppression, election denial, disinformation, intimidation and legislative subversion.

== United States ==
Richard L. Hasen outlines three main avenues for election subversion in the United States: 1) disqualify votes where a partisan body justifies changing the outcome, (2) fraudulent or suppressive election administration, and (3) actors disrupting the voting, the counting of votes, or the assumption of power by the true winner.

There were many efforts at election subversion (as well as voter suppression) promoting false claims of election fraud before, during and after attempted election subversion, with the belief in widespread election fraud raising the risk of an election being subverted.

== Avenues for election subversion ==
=== Disqualification of votes ===
Rules that make voting more difficult for some, for example, can become a pretext for disqualifying votes, regardless of whether or not it justifies such a radical action. Activists aligned with Trump have been aggressive in trying to ensure that the voters eligible to vote are more likely to support their candidate in 2024.

The independent state legislature theory in the U.S. suggests allowing state legislatures to unilaterally disqualify votes and send their own electors regardless of the vote outcome. The use of the theory was rejected in Moore v. Harper by the US Supreme Court in 2023. Even without the theory, the concern still exists that a Republican state legislature might cite uncertainty as a pretext to throw out legal votes and decide the outcome of an election for Donald Trump in 2024.

=== Election insecurity ===
The lack of election security best-practices creates opportunities for compromised election systems/ballots by third-parties which can also foster mistrust of the results even without evidence of tampering.

=== Intimidation and/or replacement of election officials ===
By major candidates calling into question the integrity of elections, the ensuing threats against election officials have led to hundreds of resignations in the U.S. for example, leading to concerns of understaffing and some vacancies being filled by hyper-partisans interested in election subversion. Detroit experienced significant intimidation by Trump-supporters during the counting of ballots in 2020, including banging on the glass and shouting at the workers counting ballots.

=== Question/deny legitimacy of election ===
This tactic to deny unfavorable results weakens the power of the winners through decreasing the number of citizens who consider them legitimate, potentially leading to a breakdown in the rule of law as was seen on January 6, 2021 in the United States. These claims can also be used to try to justify the manipulation of election results in the courts or other bodies of power such as legislatures.

== See also ==
- Authoritarianism
- Democratic backsliding
- Election interference
- Electoral fraud
- Fascism
- Unfair election
- Voter suppression
