= Drive-thru voting =

Method of voting in an election

Drive-thru voting describes the method of voting in an election whereby completed ballot papers are submitted by placing them in a drop-box accessible from an automobile. Drive-thru voting is an alternative to having voters go in person to a polling station, vote electronically via an electronic voting system, and postal voting.

== Use ==
This method of voting is not heavily utilized yet but has been available in El Dorado County, California, for the 2008 election year where more than 500 voters used the drop boxes, and in Calgary, Alberta, for the 2017 election.

On Wednesday, March 26, 2020, the Town of Vernon, CT held a historic drive-thru vote and town meeting. This meeting was to approve a transfer of $2,986,198.00 from the town's general fund to the capital non-recurring account to pay down debt related to purchases made via internal lease financing.

The vote was the vision of Vernon Mayor and State Senator Daniel Champagne, who designed the vote together with Town Administrator Michael J. Purcaro, town staff and local elected officials. Mayor Champagne told local media the vote was "all about preserving democracy." Mayor Champagne told NBC Connecticut, "We figured out a way to do it safely. We get people to vote and we should just keep going, keep government moving."

Voters cast their votes using hand signals through their windshields to follow public health guidance and social distancing recommendations during the COVID-19 pandemic. A total of 55 votes were cast on March 26, 2020, and the question based with 54 in favor and 1 opposed.

Vernon Town Administrator and Director of Emergency and Risk Management Michael Purcaro believes that this vote may be the first of its kind in the nation. Mr. Purcaro said, "we're all learning countrywide how to keep our democratic processes moving forward" while working to prevent the spread of virus.

The Town of Vernon held a second drive-up vote on Tuesday March 28, 2020 as part of the town meeting on the annual budget. In accordance with executive orders issued by the Connecticut Governor in response to COVID-19, Vernon held a virtual town meeting followed by a drive-thru vote. The vote was held at Rockville High School where voters decided the town's annual $94.1 million budget. It was held in a similar manner to the March 26, 2020 vote at Town Hall. Voters either drove or walked up to the polling site where they had to show proper identification through their car window or from a safe distance. Taxpayers then cast their votes at a second station using hand signals in order to follow social distancing guidelines and prevent the spread of COVID-19. Voters overwhelmingly approved the zero-tax increase budget by a vote of 106–4. Mr. Purcaro said, "our primary concern is for the health and well-being of our community. We also continue to be deeply concerned about the health of our democracy throughout this crisis. The right to vote is the foundation of our democracy. The constitution is not suspended in times of crisis."

== Criticism ==
The drive-thru method is supported for its convenience compared to traditional voting methods. It can also be used to offer expanded hours for voting as a box can be made available 24 hours a day.

Concerns about voting in a box and postal voting have been raised. The system has less protection to ensure a secret ballot, in that people cast their vote outside the security of a polling station. In addition, the boxes could be tampered with or vandalized, if left unmonitored. In an interview, Texas Governor Greg Abbott claimed drive-thru voting could undermine voting integrity if passengers are present during the voting process. Abbot claimed voting integrity has historically been maintained by ensuring voting can take place in private, and that the presence of passengers could have a coercive effect on voters. Another criticism of Governor Abbott is that propaganda such as political bumper stickers could be in view of vehicles in line. This is against Texas state law, since it undermines voting integrity by permitting the presence of propaganda on voting premises, he said. This form of voting was recently prohibited in Texas's new voting bill.

== See also ==
- Convenience voting
