= Convenience voting =

Voting that does not occur on the day of the election at the voting precinct

Convenience voting is any form of voting that does not occur on the day of the election at the voting precinct. This may involve changing the timing of voting so that it still occurs at the polling place, but not on election day (early voting), or changing the location of voting so that it still occurs on election day, but not at the polling place (electronic voting). It can also mean changing both the location and timing of voting (absentee voting and postal voting).

== History ==
Modern elections historically consisted of a voter casting their ballot in person on a designated election day. Requiring voters to cast a ballot in-person on a designated day can limit citizen participation. Modern elections held on weekdays, as in the US and UK, can disenfranchise some voters who cannot wait in long lines. Requiring people to vote in person can disadvantage the disabled or elderly. In his 1948 Absentee Voters and Suffrage Laws, George Frederick Miller argued that laws should be created to move "the one or two ounce ballot to the polls instead of the 100 or 200 pound elector".

At the beginning of the early 20th century, postal voting was first deployed at scale, with Australians able to vote by mail in the 1906 Australian federal election if they lived more than 7 mi (11 km) from a polling place. Beginning in the 1990s, established democracies began expanding convenience voting in response to declining voter turnout. This included rolling out new methods of voting or removing participation barriers to existing methods of convenience voting. The role of the US in increasing convenience voting has been called "pioneering", and much research about convenience voting is based in the US.

== Types ==
Convenience voting can occur in several ways.

=== Absentee ===
Voting with an absentee ballot consists of traditional absentee voting, in which a limited number of circumstances are accepted for requesting an absentee ballot, or no-excuse absentee voting, in which voters do not need an approved reason to apply for an absentee ballot. Every democracy allows for traditional absentee voting, with no-excuse absentee voting less prevalent.

=== Early ===
Similar to absentee voting, early voting may or may not require an approved reason. As of 2017, early voting without an approved reason was legal in Australia, Canada, Germany, New Zealand, Sweden, and 35 US states. Early voting has been an especially popular form of convenience voting. In several recent elections (2012 United States elections, 2013 Australian federal election, 2014 Swedish general election, and 2014 New Zealand general election), more than a quarter of all ballots were cast by early voters.

=== Electronic ===
Electronic voting, or casting votes online, has been used in Estonia in 2005 and 2007, and in the Netherlands in 2007. It has been used for multiple elections in Switzerland and the United Kingdom.

=== Postal ===
In postal voting, also known as voting by mail, voters receive a ballot in the mail about two weeks before election day. Once filled out, the ballot can be returned by mail or dropped off at a local elections office. Vote by mail is used widely in the UK, in some local elections in Canada, and in the US states of Oregon and Washington.

=== Other ===
As of 2008, the US states of Vermont and Maine allow for a telephone voting system, designed primarily for voters with disabilities. Some districts permit voters to fax a completed ballot in, particularly overseas or military voters.

== Effects ==
=== Voter turnout ===
Though convenience voting was intended to increase voter turnout, it has mixed results on political participation. In a 2011 publication, Larocca and Klemanski argued that early voting could actually decrease turnout. Other studies conclude that convenience voting can have a statistically significant impact on turnout, but only causing increases of 2–4%. It has been argued that any turnout impacts are short-lived; as the novelty of the new convenience voting method fades, turnout returns to previous levels.

=== Voter composition ===
It has been researched whether or not convenience voting influences the composition of voters—whether it makes certain demographics or members of a political party more or less likely to vote. A 2020 study of postal voting in the US found that universal postal voting had a neutral effect on partisan turnout, and thus did not favor either major political party.

It has been suggested that convenience voting does not reduce the socioeconomic bias of the electorate (those who vote tend to be better off than those who do not), and it is possible that convenience voting could strengthen this bias. Other research indicates that convenience voting does not necessarily only benefit well-represented groups. Overall, voters who are elderly or disabled are more likely to vote by mail.

=== Cost ===
By extending the period of time in which a voter can cast a ballot, convenience voting lengthens get out the vote efforts. Early voting could increase the cost of political campaigns by as much as 25%. Early voting could therefore disadvantage campaigns with smaller budgets.

The overall administrative cost of convenience voting is unknown, and local results are variable. In Contra Costa County, California, the number of absentee ballots increased by 49% from 2004 to 2008, but the associated costs of those absentee ballots increased 6%. Therefore, the cost per ballot went from $3.98 to 2.84 (29% decrease). During the same time period in Weld County, Colorado, absentee votes increased 151% but the cost increased over 1,000% due to the county contracting out for the service. In Thurston County, Washington, Sam Reed said that the administrative cost of a mailed ballot was $2.87, compared to $8.10 for an in-person ballot.
