= Vote Early Day =

Civic voting holiday

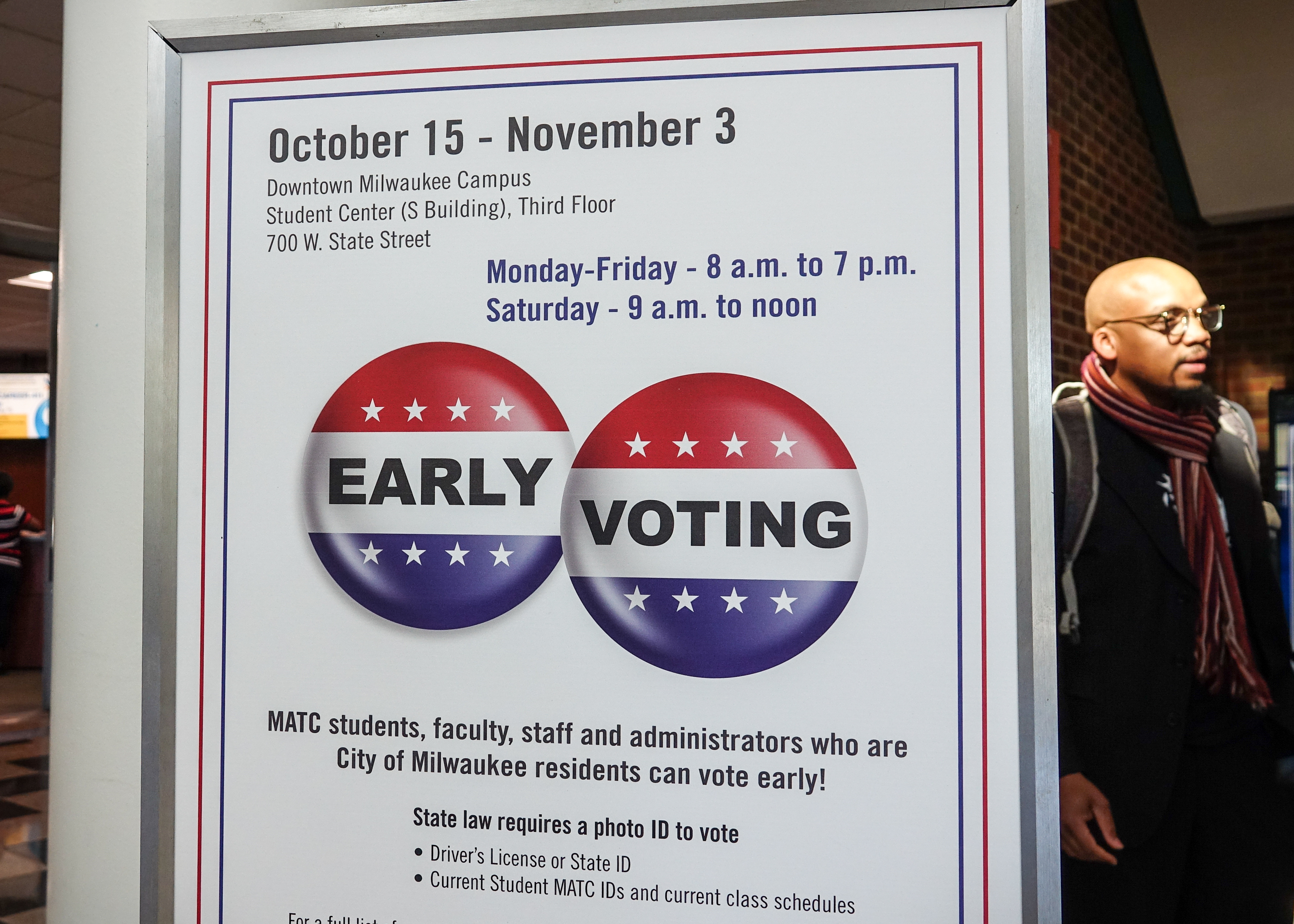
Early voting poster

Vote Early Day is a movement by a coalition of nonprofits and businesses which encourages voters to use early ballots and designates October 24 as the official “Vote Early Day”. MTV and over 65 partners introduced “Vote Early Day” with the goal to become a new U.S. national civic holiday. Vote Early Day is meant to encourage eligible United States citizens to vote early. The effort also intends to assist people, particularly young voters, to stay informed on what their state's laws are related to early voting.

== Background ==
Early voting permits registered voters to cast ballots before an election. In states that allow no-excuse early voting, a voter does not need to provide a reason for being unable to vote on Election Day. Whether early voting is helpful or detrimental, and whether it should be expanded or limited, are subjects of debate. Proponents of early voting argue that it may increase participation among particular demographic groups, reduce wait times at the polls, and facilitate the correction of errors. Opponents of early voting argue that it can decrease overall turnout, lead to poorly informed voting, and increase costs for campaigns.

Democrats are assumed to benefit from higher election turnout, however studies do not fully support that hypothesis.

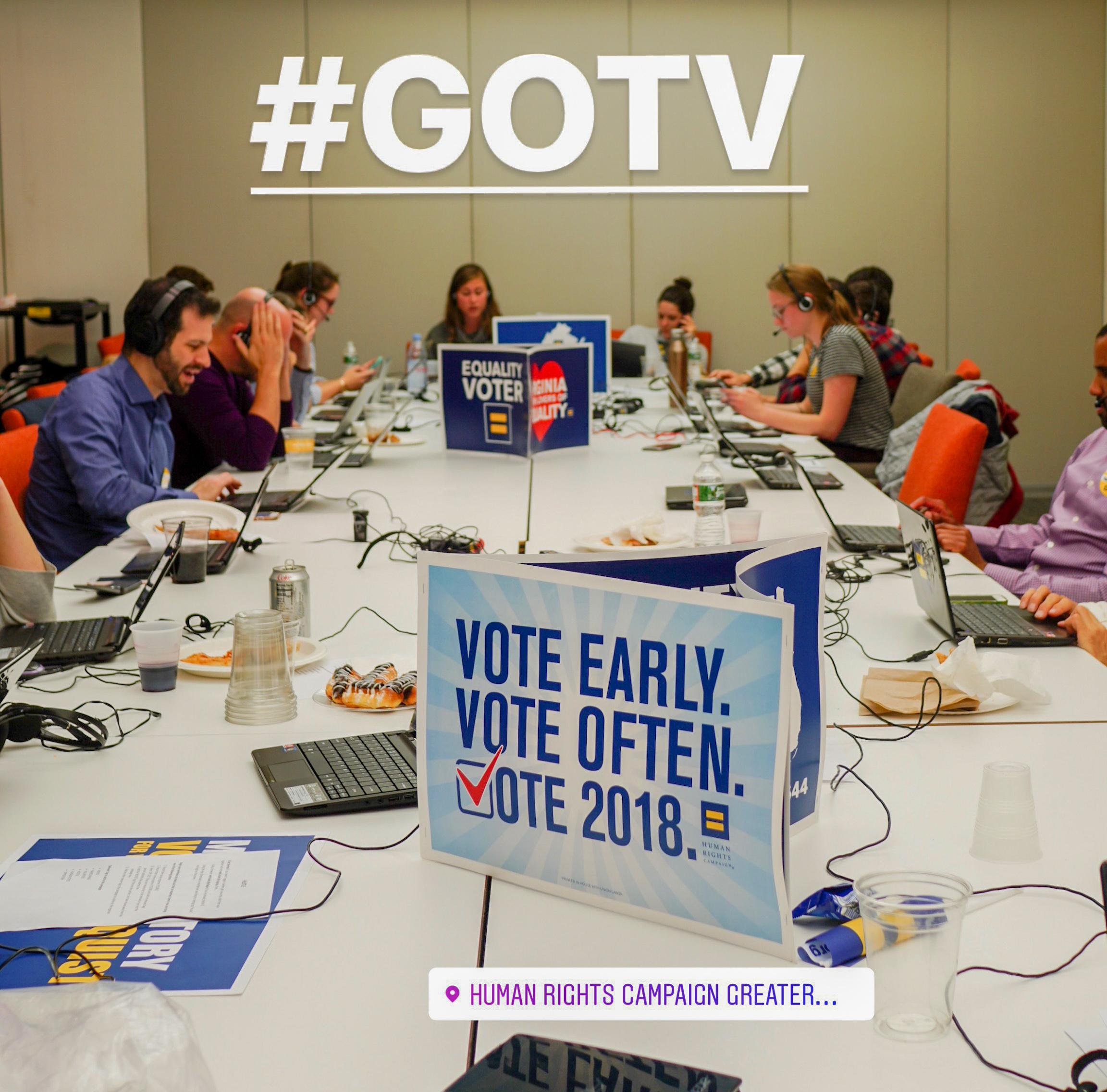
Vote early GOTV

The Vote Early Day organization was formed as a nonpartisan, centralized source to create awareness and provide information and resources about Vote Early Day. Partner funding comprises election administrations, businesses, higher education, community groups, and nonprofit organizations. Their website gives direct information and links to other groups’ websites about state-by-state rules for U.S. citizens living or deployed outside the United States concerning early voting. They also provide resources about voting in general, including election deadlines by state, including mail and in-person; voter registration information; voter ID information; election protection hotline; multilingual help line, free rideshare to vote early; and mail ballot tracking.

== Activities ==
=== 2020 ===
The MTV campaign launched with partners across media, consumer brands, and advocacy organizations, and it had the advantage of being independent.

The bipartisan initiative “Vote Early Day 2020” recruited companies to motivate people to vote by absentee ballots or in person early in response to the coronavirus pandemic.

Election officials and organizations across the country, including Georgia Secretary of State Brad Raffensperger, inaugurated Vote Early Day to promote participation to vote prior to Election Day day.

Brands from technology, retail, and entertainment, including Ad Council, ViacomCBS, have promoted early voting using digital, television, and social media along with referrals to websites that offer voter information tools.

MTV paid for the printing and mailing of ballot applications requested through the network's voter initiative campaign.

University of Martha Washington shared news that due to new legislation passed by the Virginia General Assembly, Virginia residents are allowed to vote early in-person in their Registrar's office or designated regional voting center.

US House of Representatives, David Scott used Vote Early Day 2020, to ensure that voters have access to resources to help safe and secure voting.

=== 2021 ===
Boulder County Elections and Avery Brewing Company co-hosted a Vote Early Day event where voters could bring their ballots to the drop box at Avery Brewing, obtain an “I Voted” sticker, register to vote, acquire voting information, and collect Vote Early Day souvenirs.

Indiana University encouraged their students to get involved in civic engagement by registering, learning, and advocating.

Marywood University’s nonpartisan campaign, Pacers to the Polls, promoted increased voter registration, preparedness, and turnout among their students.

=== 2022 ===
On October 28, 2022 MTV broadcast MTV LIVE: VOTE EARLY DAY, a digital celebration to get out the vote early.

The League of Women Voters offered reasons for voting early, including flexibility, convenience, and personal health and safety.

Loyola University Chicago, University of Illinois Urbana-Champaign, University of Massachusetts, Germanna Community College, Mercer University, Wichita State University, Middle Tennessee State University, Stony Brook University, San Jose State University, Emory University, and California State University San Marcos published school calendars identifying the Vote Early Day civic holiday.

Illinois Library Association has joined the nonpartisan movement of over 3,000 companies, nonprofits, and election entities to ensure all Americans have the resources to vote early.

=== 2023 ===
Over 400 Philadelphia students rallied at City Hall to encourage new voters to cast their votes early.

Boulder County Elections joined with three Boulder County organizations/businesses: Intercambio, Emergency Family Assistance Association (EFAA), and Avery Brewing to host three Vote Early Day events.

The Fulton County Department of Registration and Elections informed citizens about the options to cast their ballots ahead of Election Day.

The City of Lewiston partnered with national Vote Early Day to remind voters to order an absentee ballot, stop by and vote in person, or pick up a ballot for a family member.

Colorado Secretary of State Jena Griswold encouraged voters to return their ballots early either by mail, at a drop box, or at a voting center.

The Pawtucket Board of Canvassers announced their participation with thousands of nationwide organizations to celebrate Vote Early Day.

Fox News aired an interview with the executive director of "Vote Early Day" promoting the importance of early voting.

To promote awareness of National Vote Early Day with students, the Wichita State University Shockers Vote! Coalition hosted a trivia game at the Rhatigan Student Center.

The Minnesota Timberwolves and Lynx announced its annual Pack the Vote initiative to educate voters and inspire civic engagement.

At a joint press conference, Colorado County Clerks encouraged voters to return their mailed ballots ahead of election day to assure timely processing. Records from the Secretary of State's Office showed that less than 223,000 of Colorado's 4 million eligible voters had returned their ballots early.

The City of Aurora, Colorado asked voters to return ballots early to ensure votes are counted.

Emory University with Emory Votes Initiative, Emory NAACP hosted a nonpartisan GOTV rally and march to the DeKalb County polling site. The event included music, Emory Votes voting swag, and giveaways.

The League of Women Voter of Detroit posted support of the civic holiday, stating that “over 3,000,000 voters cast their ballots on Vote Early Day alone.”

Former President of the United States, Barack Obama, has extended an invitation to all voters to actively participate in the elections taking place in various states across the nation. Obama highlighted the significance of voter engagement as participation is critical to the democratic process.

The Cuyahoga County Board of Elections (BOE), in collaboration with Cuyahoga County Health and Human Services, invited registered voters to celebrate Vote Early Day by casting their vote.

University of Illinois Chicago celebrates Vote Early Day by pointing out that when individuals vote early, they will head off last-minute problems that may prevent them from casting their ballots as well as help shorten voting lines on Election Day.

The Ad Council suggested airing new public service announcements that encourage audiences to celebrate Vote Early Day.
