= Overseas Absentee Voting Act =

2003 Philippine law

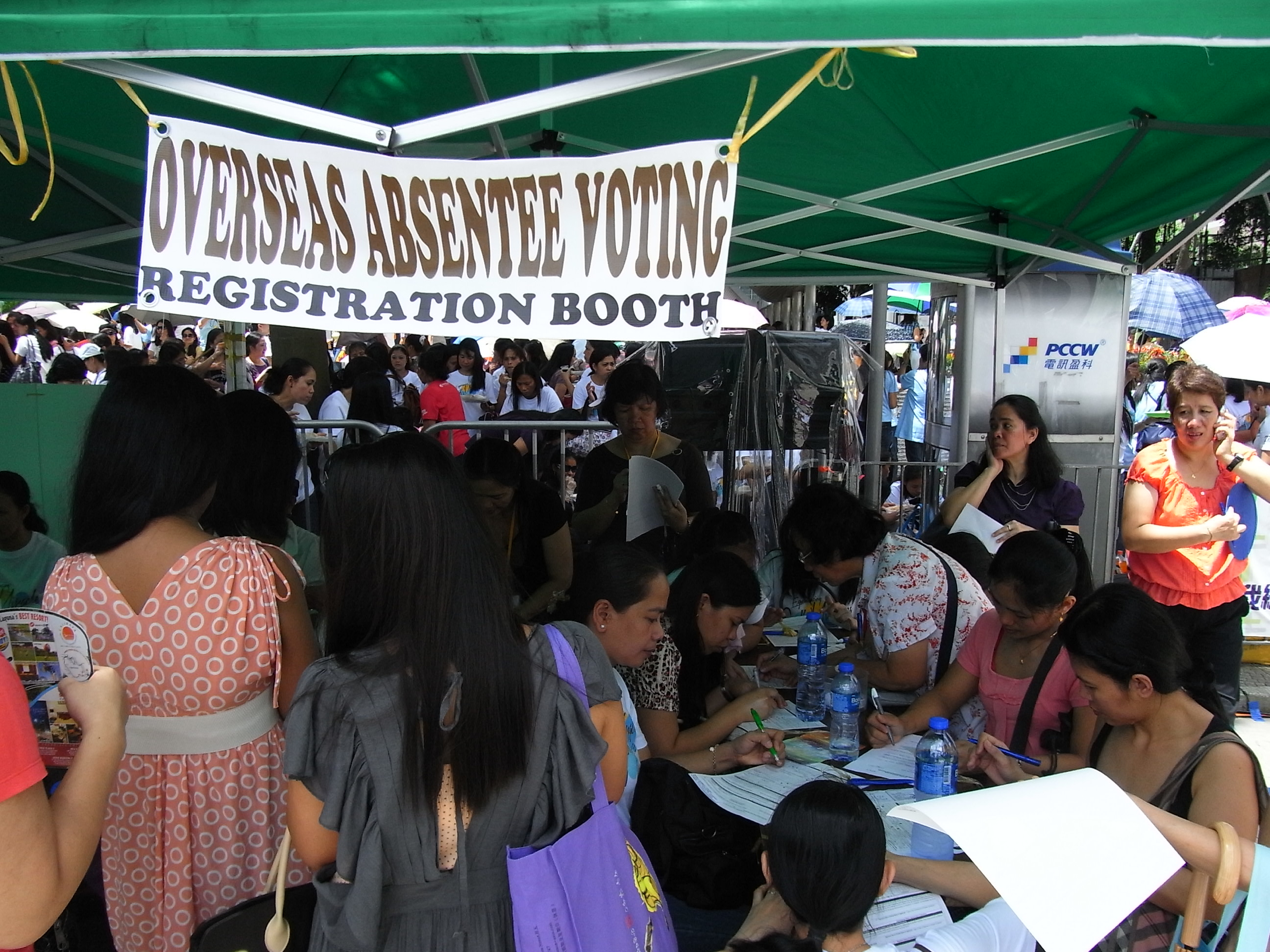
An overseas absentee voting registration booth in Chater Road, Hong Kong for the 2013 general election

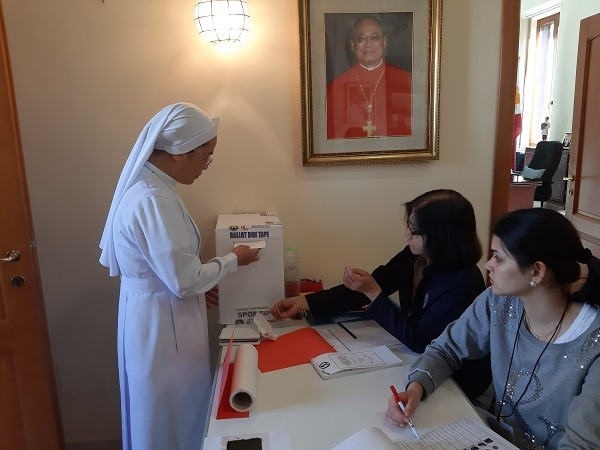
A Catholic nun casts her ballot for the 2019 general election at the Embassy of the Philippines, Holy See

The Overseas Absentee Voting Act, officially designated as Republic Act No. 9189, is a Philippine law that provides an absentee voting system for Filipino citizens residing or working outside of the Philippines who are qualified voters. It was enacted on February 4, 2003, after an estimated 25% of the Filipino population working or living overseas at the time was found misrepresented on elections. It is a consolidation of Senate Bill No. 2104 and House Bill No. 3570, the first draft was authored in Congress on July 22, 2002. The act is implemented by the Commission on Elections (COMELEC) with the help of the Department of Foreign Affairs (DFA).

== Eligible positions ==
A registered overseas absentee voter may vote for the following positions:

- President (only in presidential election years)
- Vice president (only in presidential election years)
- Senators
- Party-list representatives (The party is the one being voted)

== Eligibility ==
R.A. 9189 states that all Filipino citizens abroad who are not disqualified by law and at least 18 years old by the time of elections will be entitled to vote. The eligible individuals are required to file their applications personally at the Philippine embassy or consulate nearest their region. They are also required to be holders of a valid Philippine passport with an accomplished overseas absentee voting (OAV) registration form from the commission on elections. For seafarers a photocopy of their seaman's book is required. Lastly if the individual availed the citizen retention and reacquisition act (R.A. 9225), they would need to submit their order of approval application for the said act.

== 2004 Elections ==
The Department of Foreign Affairs (DFA) spent a total of 112.71 million pesos for the overseas absentee voters in 2004. The Philippine government put-up 89 registration centers across the globe along with 44 posts in 154 area dedicated for field registration. Data capturing machines were also based at DFA embassies and consulates. The registration period for 7 months was trimmed to 2 months.

The turnout yielded 364,187 registrants where 233,092 went on to vote. The 64 percent turnout rate was lower than what was expected thus prompted the Philippine senate to do a joint congressional inquiry on December 13, 2004, Sen. Rodolfo Biazon was the preceding chairman of the committee. The factors that affected the low turnout were attributed to the following:

- Registration period being shortened by 5 months
- The voting requirements made it difficult for overseas Filipino workers (OFW) and seafarers who were geographically dispersed in more than 180 countries
- The voting facilities were only limited to 87 polls
- Limited days off at work prevented many from registering
- Cost considerations
- Immigrant disqualification

== 2010 Elections ==
Preparations for the 2009 registration began as early as April 2008 where the commissioner of COMELEC took charge of the overseas absentee voting process. COMELEC held consultations with non-governmental organizations, the Department of Foreign Affairs (DFA) and the Commission on Filipinos Overseas (CFO) to ensure that voter turnout in the 2004 elections would not be repeated. A massive information dissemination campaign was also proposed to help out in the information drive. The registration period was postponed to start on February 1, 2009 instead of the originally planned start date of December 1, 2008, this was done to ensure that the embassies and consulates have enough time to prepare. The registration period ends on August 31, 2009, for a total of almost seven months, two months shorter of the original plan.

Makati Rep. Teodoro Locsin Jr. has taken on the initiative to make the necessary amendment to the overseas absentee voting bill. The amendment will take off one of the requirements needed for registration, specifically the affidavit of intent to return which is required of Filipino immigrants to avail of the OAV bill. This takes away the fear of Filipino U.S. green card holders who fear that their residency will be affected by submitting this affidavit.

== See also ==
- Absentee ballot
