= Absentee ballot =

Voting, election, ballot papers, voted other than at an assigned polling place, mail

An absentee ballot is a vote cast by someone who is unable to attend the official polling station to which the voter is normally allocated. Methods include voting at a different location, postal voting, proxy voting and online voting. Increasing the ease of access to absentee ballots is seen by many as one way to improve voter turnout through convenience voting, though some countries require that a valid reason, such as infirmity or travel, be given before a voter can participate in an absentee ballot. Early voting overlaps with absentee voting. Early voting includes votes cast before the official election day(s), by mail, online or in-person at voting centers which are open for the purpose. Some places call early in-person voting a form of "absentee" voting, since voters are absent from the polling place on election day.

In the electoral terminology of some countries, such as Australia, "absentee voting" means specifically a vote cast at a different polling station to one to which the voter has been allocated. "Early voting", "proxy voting" or "postal voting" are separate concepts in these countries. The history of absentee voting dates back to the 19th century, and modern-day procedures and availability vary by jurisdiction. Absentee voting may be available on demand, or limited to individuals meeting certain criteria, such as a proven inability to travel to a designated polling place. Many electors are required to apply for absentee voting, although some may receive a postal ballot by default. In some elections postal voting is the only voting method allowed and is referred to as all-postal voting. Typically, postal votes must be mailed back on or before the scheduled election day. However, in some jurisdictions return methods may allow for dropping off the ballot in person via secure drop boxes or at voting centers.

Electoral laws typically allow for the integrity and secrecy of the submitted ballot to be maintained, and stipulate a series of checks to protect against voter fraud. Voting at a distant polling place is subject to the same controls as voting locally, though distant staff are less likely to recognize an impersonator than local staff. Voting by mail is sometimes controlled by using security printing, such as special paper, or by requiring signatures of voters and sometimes witnesses, though signature comparisons have 10-14% error rates. Thousands of ballots fail these checks and are rejected. Evidence of fraud is uncommon, but Russia has been reported to use absentee voting for vote monitoring enabling voter intimidation. While postal voting has a greater risk of fraud than in-person voting, on an absolute level cases of known fraud are extremely rare. The principle of secret ballot might be violated before the ballot is submitted.

== Methods ==
=== Voting at a different polling station ===
Among countries where voters are allocated to one or several specific polling station(s) (such as the polling station closest to the voter's residential address, or polling stations within a particular district, province or state), some countries provide a mechanism by which voters can nevertheless cast their ballots on election day at a different polling station.

The reasons for allocating voters to specific polling stations are generally logistical. Absentee voting at a different polling station might be catered for by, for example, designating some larger polling stations as available for absentee voting, and equipping such polling stations with the ballot papers (or the means to produce ballot papers) applicable to an absentee voter.

=== Postal voting ===
In a postal vote, the ballot papers are posted out to the voter – usually only on request – who must then fill them out and return them, often with the voter's signature and sometimes a witness signature to prove the voter's identity. Signature verification is an imperfect endeavor; the best academic researchers have 10-14% error rates. Some jurisdictions use special paper, ballot tracking, or printing to minimize forged ballots.

=== All-postal voting ===
All-postal voting is the form of postal voting where all electors receive their ballot papers through the post, not just those who requested an absentee ballot. Depending on the system applied, electors may have to return their ballot papers by post, or there may be an opportunity to deliver them by hand to a specified location.

There is some evidence that this method of voting leads to higher turnout than one where people vote in person or have to apply for a postal vote. Critics suggest that this is only a temporary impact, and that there are dangers in people using ballot papers intended for other electors.

It has been tested by a large number of local authorities in the United Kingdom for their elections, and in 2004 it was used for elections to the European Parliament and local authorities in four of the English regions (see below for more details). In 2016, the Australian Marriage Law Postal Survey was conducted via all-postal voting with a turnout of 79.5 percent.

=== Proxy voting ===
To cast a proxy vote, the user appoints someone as their proxy, by authorizing them to cast or secure their vote in their stead. The proxy must be trusted by the voter, as in a secret ballot there is no way of verifying that they voted for the correct candidate. In an attempt to solve this, it is not uncommon for people to nominate an official of their chosen party as their proxy.

=== Internet voting ===
Security experts have found security problems in every attempt at online voting, including systems in Australia, Estonia Switzerland, Russia, and the United States. More information is in the sections for each country below.

Online voting is widely used privately for shareholder votes. The election management companies do not promise accuracy or privacy. In fact one company uses an individual's past votes for research, and to target ads.

== By country ==
=== Australia ===
In Australia the term "absentee ballot" refers specifically to the procedure used when a voter attends a voting place which is not in the electoral district in which they are registered to vote. Instead of marking the ballot paper and putting it in the ballot box, the voter's ballot paper is placed in an envelope and then it is sent by the voting official to the voter's home district to be counted there.

Postal voting and early voting are separate procedures also available to voters who would not be in their registered electoral districts on a voting day. At the 2016 Australian federal election, there were 1.2 million postal votes cast, amounting to 8.5 percent of total votes.

Postal voting in Australia was introduced for federal elections in 1902, and first used at the 1903 election. It was abolished by the Fisher government in 1910, following claims that it was open to abuse and biased towards rural voters. The Cook government's bill to restore postal voting was one of the "triggers" for the double dissolution prior to the 1914 election. Postal voting was eventually restored by the Hughes government in 1918 and has not been challenged since, although the provisions and requirements have been amended on a number of occasions.

Prior to Federation in 1901, Western Australia introduced a form of postal voting in 1877 with strict eligibility criteria. South Australia introduced postal voting for seamen in 1890, and a further act in 1896 gave postal votes to any elector who would be more than 15 miles (24 km) from home on election day, as well as for any woman unable to travel "by reason of her health". Victoria passed a similar law in 1899, and the first federal postal voting legislation was also modelled on the 1896 South Australian act.

==== Procedure in Australia ====
Postal voting at a federal level is governed by the Commonwealth Electoral Act 1918 and administered by the Australian Electoral Commission (AEC). Postal votes are available to those who will be absent from their electoral division through travel, or who those are unable to attend a polling booth due to illness, infirmity, "approaching childbirth", caring responsibilities, reasonable fears for their safety, religious beliefs, imprisonment, status as a silent elector, or employment reasons.

Eligible voters may make a postal vote application (PVA) prior to each election, or apply for status as a "general postal voter" and receive a postal ballot automatically. Postal voters receive their ballot(s) and a prepaid envelope containing their name and address, as well as a predetermined security question from the PVA. Voters are required to sign the envelope and provide the correct answer to the security question. They are also required to have a witness sign and date the envelope. As of 2016, postal votes were able to be received and entered into the count up to 13 days after election day. Following the 2016 election, it was observed that the strict scrutiny process afforded to postal votes was a "significant contributor" to delays in declaring the results of close elections.

=== Austria ===
Austria enabled postal voting in 2007 by amending Article 26 of the Constitution of Austria. Electors request an electoral card that can be completed in person or in private and sent via post. In the 2017 election, roughly 780,000 postal ballots were cast representing 15% of all ballots.

=== Bangladesh ===
In the 2026 general election and referendum, the interim government allowed the expatriates to vote via Postal voting for the first time in its history.

=== Canada ===
The ability to vote when in-person voting is not possible was first introduced with the federal Military Voters Act in 1917, giving all Canadian soldiers and their spouses the right to vote. Public servants became eligible in 1970. The right was further extended to civilian support personnel on Canadian Forces bases in the 1977. In 1993, Bill C-114 extended the special ballot vote (Special Voting Rules) by mail to all Canadian citizens.

Use of special voting rules including vote by mail has grown with each election. In the 42nd general election (2015), the number of voters increased by 117 percent over the previous election to roughly 619,000. This number grew to roughly 660,000 in the 43rd election (2019) representing 3.6 percent of electors.

=== Czech Republic ===
In the Czech Republic voters have several options to cast their vote in absence. Since 2003, it has been possible to use a voter card (cz. voličský průkaz) to vote at different polling station. Voter cards can be used in all elections except for municipal elections. In the case of Presidential elections and elections to the Chamber of Deputies, electors with voter card can cast their ballots in person at any open polling station within or outside of Czech borders, even outside their assigned district. For elections to the European parliament, voting is possible at any polling station within the country. In case of regional elections and elections to the Senate, it is possible only within their assigned electoral district.

Postal voting was established in the Czech Republic in 2024. It is available to all voters living or stationed abroad. It can be used in elections to the Chamber of Deputies, Presidential elections and elections to the European Parliament.

If electors cannot attend the polling station due to health limitations, they can request portable ballot box. Two members of the electoral committee then take the portable box and allow the voter to vote from their home or a medical facility.

=== Estonia ===
Since 2005, Estonia has allowed voters to cast votes via the Internet (encrypted to protect voter anonymity); 2% of Estonians cast ballots via the Internet initially, and 44% did so in 2019. The Estonian Internet-voting system uses the Estonian national identity card, which is associated with a PINs unique to each voter: "all Estonians are issued a government ID with a scannable chip and a PIN number that gives them a unique online identity — they can use this identity to file their taxes or pay library fines or buy bus passes."

The security of the Estonian I-voting system remains a matter of political debate.

=== Finland ===
Finland introduced vote by post in 2019, but only for the eligible voters living permanently abroad or staying abroad at the time of the elections. Vote by post is not available for voters residing in Finland.

=== France ===
France allows voting by "procuration", which is literally proxy voting. It has been said access to it has been eased in regard to the coronavirus pandemic.

In the 2012 French legislative election, French citizens living abroad were permitted to cast votes electronically in the parliamentary elections (but not in the presidential election). In 2017, however, the system was dropped after the French National Cybersecurity Agency assessed an "extremely high risk" of cyberattacks in the wake of Russian interference in the 2016 United States elections.

=== Germany ===
Absentee voting has existed in Germany since 1957, originally in order to ensure that all German citizens, especially the old, sick, and disabled, and citizens living abroad, have the opportunity to participate in elections. At first, postal voters had to state why they could not cast their vote in person on Election Day; but this requirement has been dropped in 2008, allowing everyone to use postal voting. Like in many other countries, in more recent years, voting by mail has become increasingly popular among younger and non-disabled citizens residing within the country; as such, various tools are being developed to help citizens, both domestic and abroad, more easily apply for postal voting.

=== Hungary ===
Hungarian citizens living abroad who do not have an official address in Hungary are allowed to vote by mail. They are only allowed to vote for party lists, but not for local representatives. In the last parliamentary election in 2018, 267,233 votes (4.6% of all votes) were submitted via mail. 48% of all valid postal votes were submitted from Romania.

=== India ===
Only certain categories of people are eligible to register as postal voters. The Representation of the People Act-1950 (RPA) section 20(8) allows postal ballots for people on polling duty; members of the armed forces and state police as well as their spouses; employees of the Government of India who are officially posted abroad; and the President;, these are also called service voters. Additionally, people in preventive detention, disabled and those above the age of 65 years old can use postal vote. Prisoners can not vote at all.

Postal voting in India is done only through the Electronically Transmitted Postal Ballot Papers (ETPB) system of the Election Commission of India, where ballot papers are distributed to the registered eligible voters and they return the votes by post. When the counting of votes commences, these postal votes are counted first before the counting of votes from the electronic voting machines of all other voters.

The Communist Party of India (Marxist) has alleged that postal ballots "will adversely effect the verifiability of a large number of voters, thus, transparency and integrity of the process", and expressed concerns with "instances of manipulation and malpractice" with postal ballots.

Section 20 of the RPA-1950 disqualified non-resident Indians (NRI) from getting their names registered in the electoral rolls. Consequently, it also prevented non-residents from voting. In August 2010, Representation of the People (Amendment) Bill-2010 which allows voting rights to NRI's was passed in both Lok Sabha with subsequent gazette notifications on Nov 24, 2010. With this NRI's could vote in Indian elections if physically present at the time of voting. Civic society organizations have urged the government to amend the RPA act to allow NRI's and people on the move to cast their vote through absentee ballot system.

=== Indonesia ===
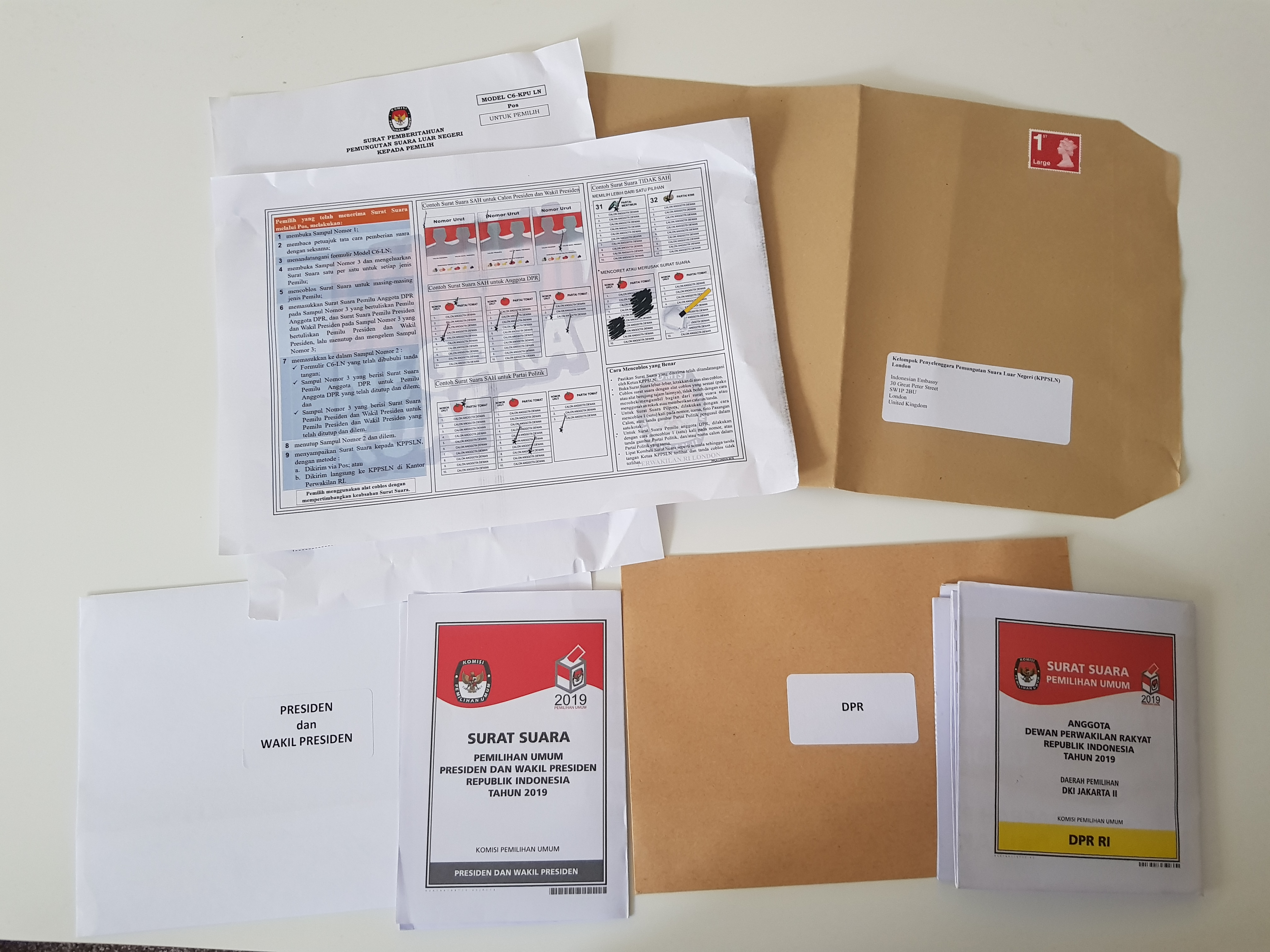
Postal voting documents sent to an Indonesian voter in the United Kingdom during the 2019 Indonesian general election

Eligible Indonesians living abroad are able to vote by mail in national elections by registering at the Indonesian overseas election commission in their country of residence. Besides presidential elections, they are also able to vote in DPR elections. All overseas Indonesian voters are included in the Jakarta 2nd constituency, which also contains Central and South Jakarta.

=== Republic of Ireland ===
In the Republic of Ireland, postal votes are used in Seanad Éireann elections for the university constituencies and the vocational panels, both of which have restricted franchises. Otherwise, postal voting is only available in a restricted set of circumstances. The Irish constitution requires a secret ballot and the courts have interpreted this quite narrowly. Postal votes are available to people who by reason of their occupation cannot vote normally. They are also available to students living away from home, to people with disabilities, to prisoners (since January 2007), and to long-term residents of hospitals, nursing homes and other similar institutions.

=== Israel ===
Israel does not have an absentee ballot system for all citizens. Absentee ballots are restricted to soldiers, prisoners, sailors, overseas diplomats, disabled persons and hospitalized people. The votes are not cast directly but placed in a double envelope with identifying information and counted directly by the elections committee only after verifying that the voter has not voted at his or her official polling station. Most absentee ballots are cast the day of the elections in alternate polling stations. Early voting is limited to civil servants overseas. There is no postal voting.

=== Italy ===
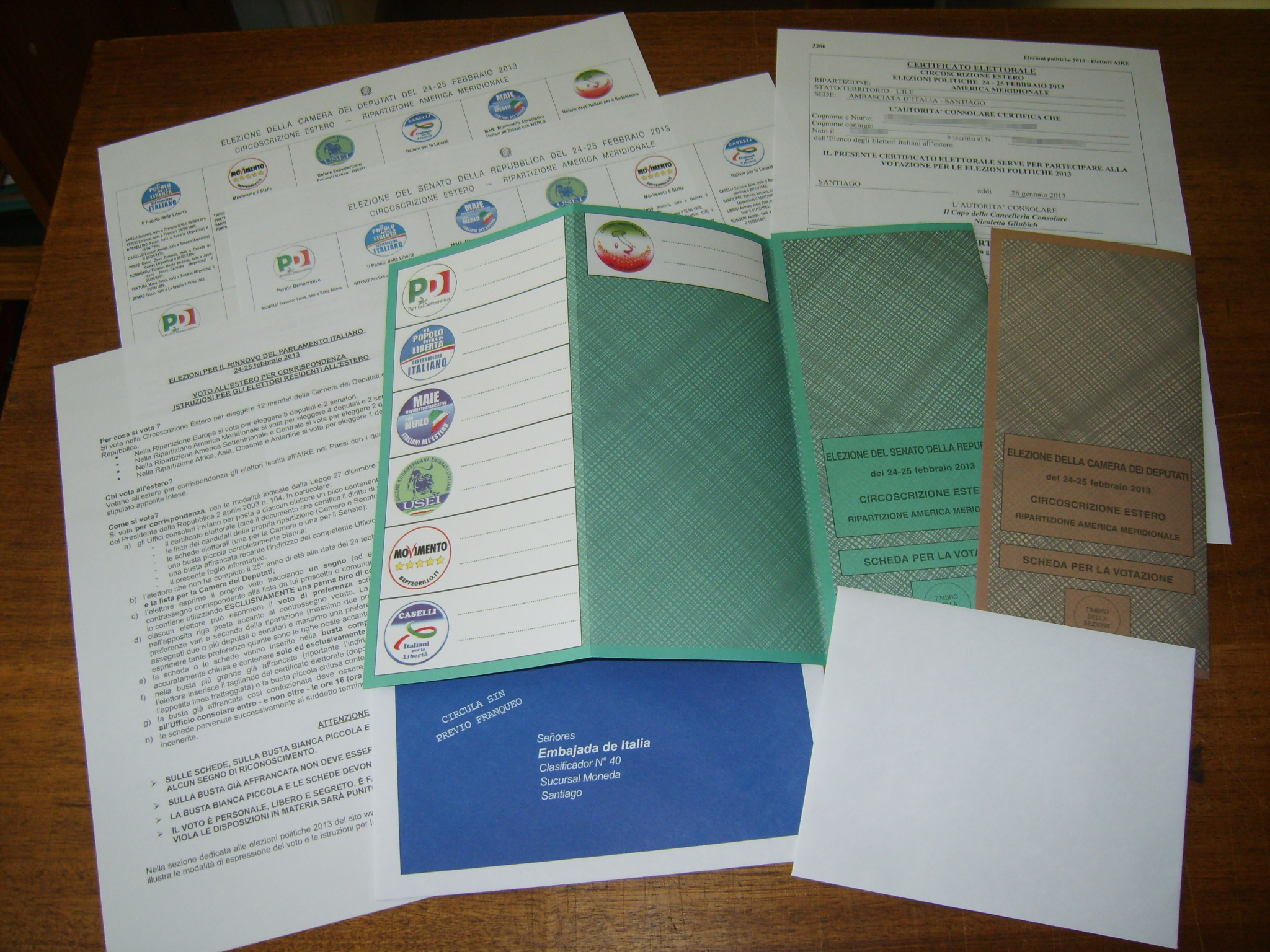
Electoral package sent to an Italian voter in South America during the 2013 Italian general election

Since 2001 Italian citizens living abroad have the right to vote by mail in all national elections and referendums being held in Italy (provided they had registered their residence abroad with their relevant consulate).

=== Kazakhstan ===
In Kazakhstan, citizens who are unable to cast their ballot at their registered polling station on election day may request an absentee-voter certificate, also known as an off-register certificate, from their original precinct election commission. Once issued, the certificate allows the voter to cast their ballot at another polling station, such as a location where they will be temporarily staying, at an embassy abroad, or at a special polling station in remote areas, hospitals, ships, or detention centers. The deadline for obtaining an absentee-voter certificate is usually 6:00 p.m. local time on the day before the election.

Voting by mail (postal voting) is not permitted under current law, so all ballots must be cast in person, either at a regular polling station, a special station, or the temporary location designated in the certificate.

=== Malaysia ===
In Malaysia, opposition leader and former deputy prime minister Anwar Ibrahim alleged that postal votes have been used by the ruling Barisan Nasional coalition in securing seats in certain constituencies. He also said that in one particular constituency (Setiawangsa), he claimed that his Parti Keadilan Rakyat had actually won during the 2008 elections, before 14,000 postal votes came in awarding the incumbent BN parliamentarian the seat with a majority of 8,000 votes. In Malaysia, only teachers, military personnel, and policemen based away from their constituencies are eligible to submit postal votes.

=== Mexico ===
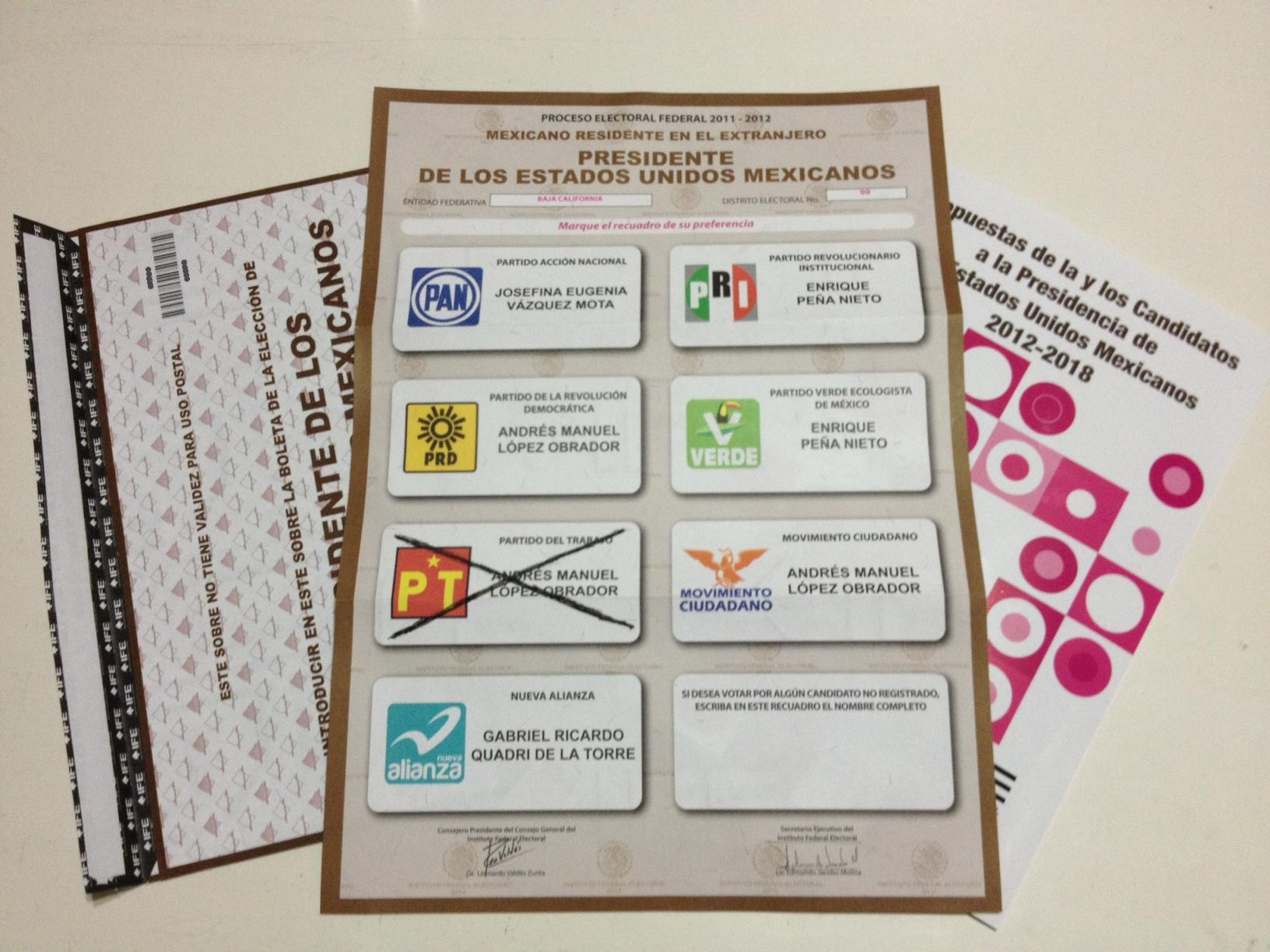
Postal ballot paper for Mexico federal election 2012

In Mexico, since the 2006 federal elections, postal voting for people living abroad has been permitted. A request can be made to the National Electoral Institute which then sends the ballots outside the country.

=== Netherlands ===
In the Netherlands, liberalised proxy voting is available. Voters can authorise someone else to cast their ballot without having to go through a registration procedure. Voters can cast a maximum of 2 proxy votes along with their own ballot. Postal ballots and Internet voting are only available to Dutch citizens living abroad, or having occupational duties abroad on election day.

Electronic voting was banned in the Netherlands in 2007, and in 2017 Dutch authorities also abandoned electronic vote counting, conducting an all-paper, all-manual vote count in an effort to block foreign interference in its elections.

=== Philippines ===
As provided by the Overseas Absentee Voting Act, absentee voting in Philippine elections is only available in certain circumstances, such as for Overseas Filipino Workers or other migrants. Before 2025, votes had to be cast in person at select polling places, such as consulate offices, or through mail-in ballots in select countries. However, internet voting was used for the first time during the 2025 general election in selected foreign posts.

Local absentee voting as pursuant to Republic Act No. 7166 and Executive Order No. 157 is only available for members of the Armed Forces of the Philippines, Philippine National Police, and government personnel on duty on election day. The absentee voting in both overseas and local is still manual vote counting system.

Recently, absentee voting in Hong Kong and Singapore was done through the optical scan voting due to COMELEC Resolution No. 8806 in the 2010 general elections.

Absentee voters can only vote for candidates elected by the entire electorate: the President, Vice President, senators, and party-list representatives.

=== Poland ===
In Poland, each citizen registered in the local voters' register, can get an absentee voter's certificate (AVC), which is a piece of paper with the person's details and the local government's stamp. The person can vote with AVC at every polling station countrywide and worldwide (in Polish embassies and consulates; the polling stations abroad are created by the Minister of Foreign Affairs before every elections). An AVC is issued only for President of Poland elections, parliamentary elections and elections to the European Parliament (in that case, the AVC can be got by Polish or EU citizen, so the EU citizen can vote for Polish deputies at polling station in Poland and Polish embassies or consulates, or for deputies from the country of origin. Although, if the EU citizen registers himself in the Polish voters' register, the local officials informs appropriate office in the country of origin). In case of Senate by-elections, AVC may be issued only for voters living and registered in given single-member constituency.

Postal voting and proxy voting are also possible. Postal voting is possible both in country and abroad, but proxy voting is possible only in Poland. The proxy must be registered at the same local voters' register as a voter. The mail with the voter's ballot in postal voting is free of charge in Poland, but voter resides abroad must pay to send his ballot to the appropriate consulate.

=== Russia ===
Absentee ballots have been reportedly used for vote monitoring in Russia.

=== Slovakia ===
Slovak voters have several options to cast their vote in absence. To vote at a different polling station within Slovakia, it is possible to utilize a voter card (sk. Hlasovací preukaz). Voter cards can be used for elections to the National Council, Presidential elections and the elections to the European parliament.

Postal voting was introduced in 2004. It is allowed for elections to the National Council and for national referendums.

If electors cannot attend the polling station due to health limitations, they can request portable ballot box and cast their vote from their home or medical facility.

=== Spain ===
In Spain, for European, regional and municipal elections, voters who will be absent from their town on election day or are ill or disabled, may request a postal vote at a post office. The application must be submitted personally or through a representative in case of illness or disability certified by a medical certificate.

=== Switzerland ===
Swiss federal law allows postal voting in all federal elections and referendums, and all cantons also allow it for cantonal ballot issues. All voters receive their personal ballot by mail and may either cast it at a polling station or mail it back. As of 2019, approximately 90% of Swiss voters cast ballots using Remote Postal Voting.

In Switzerland, starting in 2004, 15 cantons conducted electronic voting pilot programs. In three cantons, Swiss voters resident abroad voted electronically; Geneva Canton, Canton of Neuchâtel, and Basel-Stadt. The programs were closed in June and July 2019, and the plan is for new designs to be available by 2023.

In 2019 the Swiss government invited researchers to test the security of online voting, and in early March 2019 researchers found back doors which let insiders, and hackers who accessed management systems, change results without detection.

=== Thailand ===
Absentee balloting started in Thailand first time in the 2000 general election. It is promulgated according to a provision in the 1997 constitution. The absentee ballot can be cast within Thailand and in foreign countries, where Thailand has diplomatic missions. Voters can cast the absentee ballot in 2 cases: (1) those who have their household registration in their constituency but will not be at their constituency on the election day, and wish to cast their vote in advance; and (2) those who physically reside in other locations out of their constituency at least 90 days prior to the election day, and will not be able to travel back to their constituency on the election day.

In both cases, voters wishing to cast their absentee ballot must register with the election committee 30 days in advance prior to the general election date. Voters within Thailand can cast their vote either at the designated district offices for absentee voting in their provinces or through mail. Likewise, voters overseas can register to vote with the Thai missions in their country of residence or send the ballot to them by mail. The absentee voting date is normally designated a week ahead of the general election date.

=== United Kingdom ===
Absentee voting in the United Kingdom is allowed by proxy or post (known as postal voting on demand) for any elector. Postal voting does not require a reason, apart from in Northern Ireland, where postal voting is available only if it would be unreasonable to expect a voter to go to a polling station on polling day as a result of employment, disability or education restrictions.

Proxy voting is allowed for people who will be away, working, or medically disabled. Anyone eligible to vote in the election may be a proxy for close relatives and two unrelated people.

In May 2003, 35 local authorities trialled all-postal voting. The outcome of those pilots was a recommendation from the UK Electoral Commission that all-postal voting should be adopted as the normal method of voting at local elections in the UK. This reflected the positive impact on voter turnout at these elections (in some places, turnout doubled) and the fact that there was no evidence of an increase in electoral fraud.

A 2016 government review said about postal voting, that "Evidence was presented of pressure being put on vulnerable members of some ethnic minority communities, particularly women and young people, to vote according to the will of the elders... the possibilities of undue influence, theft of postal votes and tampering with them after completion were all still risks."

=== United States ===
The percentage of American voters who vote by mail or absentee ballots more than tripled since 1996.

Voters may vote early or get a mailed ballot to mail back or take to a secure box or office. Most areas do not require a reason. Five states and some counties have all-postal elections. Vote-by-mail has been implemented in both Republican and Democratic states, but it became a political controversy in 2020. Availability of postal voting increases turnout.

Americans living outside the United States and members of the military and merchant marine even inside the country, and their families, may register and vote under the Uniformed and Overseas Citizens Absentee Voting Act (UOCAVA). Almost half the states require these ballots to be returned by mail. Other states allow mail along with some combination of fax, or email; four states allow a web portal.

Security of mailed ballots is controlled by using special paper in some areas, and, more often, by requiring signatures of voters and sometimes witnesses. Signature comparisons are imperfect; the best academic researchers have 10-14% error rates. Thousands of ballots fail the signature checks and are rejected. Evidence of fraud is uncommon, though postal voting has a greater risk of fraud than in-person voting. Not all states have standards for signature review. There have been concerns that signatures are improperly rejected from young and minority voters at higher rates than others, with no or limited ability of voters to appeal the rejection. Processing large numbers of ballots and signature verifications accurately has numerous challenges other than fraud.

In the 2016 US presidential election, approximately 33 million ballots were cast via mailed out ballots (about a quarter of all ballots cast).

The number of people who voted early or with mail-in ballots set records in the 2020 election. This is because of the coronavirus pandemic and people choosing the option of absentee ballots. Only five states required a valid reason to vote by mail in 2020, compared with 19 states in 2016. Across states that did not require a reason to vote by mail, 44% of votes were cast by mail in 2020. Across states that did require a reason, 12% of votes were cast by mail in 2020, up from 8% in 2016.

=== Uruguay ===
In Uruguay there is no mail in voting, online voting, or proxy voting. Every citizen is required by law to register as a voter at 18 years old, and is assigned a voter ID that contains a photo ("Credencial Cívica"). Each citizen is assigned a specific voting circuit that is close to his/her registered address. You cannot vote anywhere else, except if you are an election worker assigned to a different circuit than yours. To vote you need to go in person to the circuit and show election workers your physical voter ID. Else you need to remember the ID number. In both cases your data is compared with a copy of that ID in the circuit. If you do not even remember your ID, you can vote by fingerprint plus showing a national ID card. Every absentee ballot is manually controlled after election day to avoid the same voter casting more than one vote. The system is regarded as extremely difficult to tamper with, and accepted by all involved parties as safe and anonymous.

== See also ==
- Ballot collecting
- Free and fair election
- Provisional ballot
- Vote center
- Vote counting
- Non-resident citizen voting
