= Ballot tracking in the United States =

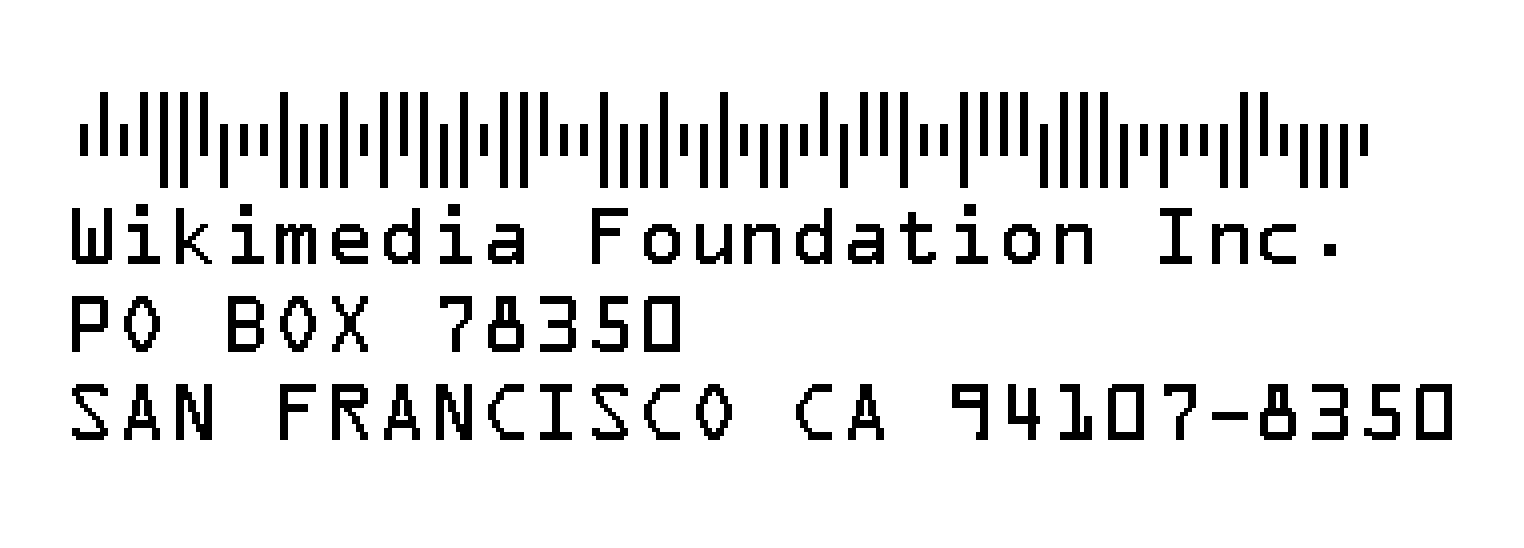
Example of USPS Intelligent Mail barcode used to track letters and packages

Ballot tracking is a tool voters and election officials use to track ballots sent to mail-in voters. Ballot tracking reports updates in the ballot's delivery and processing. This allows the voter to know when they will receive their ballot, if their ballot has been successfully delivered, and if their ballot has been successfully counted.

== Methods ==
All states send ballots with unique numbers linked to the voter. US Postal Service scans this number and sends its status to the voter or third-party tracking service, depending on the state.

All voters can choose to be notified by USPS's Informed Delivery Service to track delivery of their ballot to their address.

Voters can then go to their state's tracking website where they enter personal information, like address, DOB to find the status of their ballot.

Some states, such as California, automatically send ballot status updates to all voters.

Tracking websites by state (2020)
State	Link	Can notify users
Alabama	https://myinfo.alabamavotes.gov/voterview	Some counties
Alaska	https://myvoterportal.alaska.gov	Some counties
Arizona	https://my.arizona.vote/AbsenteeTracker.aspx	Some counties
Arkansas	https://www.voterview.ar-nova.org/VoterView	Some counties
California	https://california.ballottrax.net/voter/	Yes
Colorado	https://colorado.ballottrax.net/voter/	Yes
Connecticut	https://portaldir.ct.gov/sots/LookUp.aspx	Some counties
Delaware	https://ivote.de.gov/VoterView	Some counties
District of Columbia	https://www.dcboe.org/Voters/Absentee-Voting/Track-Absentee-Ballot	Unknown
Florida	https://registration.elections.myflorida.com/CheckVoterStatus	Some counties
Georgia	https://www.mvp.sos.ga.gov/MVP/mvp.do	Yes
Hawaii	https://ballotstatus.hawaii.gov/ballotreceipt	Some counties
Idaho	https://elections.sos.idaho.gov/ElectionLink/ElectionLink/VoterSearch.aspx	Some counties
Illinois	https://www.elections.il.gov/ElectionOperations/ElectionAuthorities.aspx	Some counties
Indiana	https://indianavoters.in.gov/	Some counties
Iowa	https://sos.iowa.gov/elections/absenteeballotstatus/absentee/search	Some counties
Kansas	https://myvoteinfo.voteks.org/voterview/	Some counties
Kentucky	https://vrsws.sos.ky.gov/VIC/	Some counties
Louisiana	https://voterportal.sos.la.gov/Home/VoterLogin	Some counties
Maine	https://apps.web.maine.gov/cgi-bin/online/AbsenteeBallot/ballot-status.pl	Some counties
Maryland	https://voterservices.elections.maryland.gov/VoterSearch	Some counties
Massachusetts	https://www.sec.state.ma.us/wheredoivotema/track/trackmyballot.aspx	Some counties
Michigan	https://mvic.sos.state.mi.us/Voter/Index	Some counties
Minnesota	https://mnvotes.sos.state.mn.us/AbsenteeBallotStatus.aspx	Some counties
Mississippi	https://www.sos.ms.gov/Elections-Voting/Pages/default.aspx	No
Missouri	https://www.sos.mo.gov/elections/goVoteMissouri/localelectionauthority	No
Montana	https://app.mt.gov/voterinfo/	Some counties
Nebraska	https://www.votercheck.necvr.ne.gov/voterview	Some counties
Nevada	https://www.nvsos.gov/votersearch/	Yes
New Hampshire	https://app.sos.nh.gov/Public/AbsenteeBallot.aspx	Some counties
New Jersey	https://www.nj.gov/state/elections/vote-track-my-ballot.shtml	Some counties
New Mexico	https://voterportal.servis.sos.state.nm.us/WhereToVote.aspx	Some counties
New York	https://nysballot.elections.ny.gov/TrackMyBallot/Search	Some counties
North Carolina	https://northcarolina.ballottrax.net/voter/	Yes
North Dakota	https://vip.sos.nd.gov/AbsenteeTracker.aspx	Some counties
Ohio	https://www.sos.state.oh.us/elections/voters/toolkit/ballot-tracking/	Some counties
Oklahoma	https://okvoterportal.okelections.us/	Some counties
Oregon	https://secure.sos.state.or.us/orestar/vr/showVoterSearch.do	Some counties
Pennsylvania	https://www.pavoterservices.pa.gov/pages/ballottracking.aspx	Some counties
Rhode Island	https://vote.sos.ri.gov/Home/UpdateVoterRecord?ActiveFlag=3	Some counties
South Carolina	https://info.scvotes.sc.gov/eng/voterinquiry/VoterInformationRequest.aspx?PageMode=AbsenteeInfo	Some counties
South Dakota	https://vip.sdsos.gov/VIPLogin.aspx	Some counties
Tennessee	https://tnmap.tn.gov/voterlookup/	Some counties
Texas	https://webservices.sos.state.tx.us/FPCA/index.aspx	Some counties
Utah	https://votesearch.utah.gov/voter-search/search/search-by-voter/track-mail-ballot	Some counties
Vermont	https://mvp.vermont.gov/	Some counties
Virginia	https://www.elections.virginia.gov/citizen-portal/	Yes
Washington	https://voter.votewa.gov/WhereToVote.aspx	Some counties
West Virginia	https://services.sos.wv.gov/Elections/Voter/AbsenteeBallotTracking	Some counties
Wisconsin	https://myvote.wi.gov/en-US/TrackMyBallot	Some counties
Wyoming	https://sos.wyo.gov/Elections/Docs/WYCountyClerks_AbsRequest_VRChange.pdf	No

== Mailed ballots in 2020 ==
As of Sept. 2020, 51 million US voters choose to have their ballot mailed, 49 million have their ballot application automatically mailed, 99 million can vote by mail, and 34 million can vote by mail for disabilities.

In the 2020 elections, 65 million voters used mail in voting.

== Functions ==
Ballot Scout, Ballot TRACE, TrackMyVote, and BallotTrax all have online portals where users can type in their voter information to see the status of their ballot.

BallotTrax uses a notification system to notify their users by text and email when their ballot will be arriving.

== Advantages ==
Ballot tracking helps under-staffed voting offices run smoother. Ballot tracking allows offices to expect and look out for lost ballots. Ballot tracking notifies users for improperly filled-out ballots.

== Services ==
=== BallotTrax ===
BallotTrax (ballottrax.com) was developed by Denver based development company i3Logix. As of August 2020, their websites boasts BallotTrax as "The World's First Complete Mail Ballot Locator & Notification System". States such as North Carolina and California have begun using BallotTrax to notify voters of their ballot status.

BallotTrax grew 10x in 2020.

As of 2020, BallotTrax is the largest ballot tracking service.

BallotTrax was used by 25 states in the 2020 election. It is estimated they have helped track 60 million ballots since 2009.

=== Ballot TRACE ===
Changes in Colorado law caused an increase in voters who chose to vote by mail in the November 3, 2009 election. This prompted Colorado to create a simple version of a ballot tracking service which allowed voters to look up their ballot and see if their local county election official had received it.

They entered into a partnership with i3Logix, along with the USPS to create a system named i3Ballot, which was renamed to the more friendly, recognizable Ballot TRACE.

=== TrackMyVote ===
Hosted by trackmymail.com, TrackMyVote is an Absentee Ballot Tracking service with which, you can track your ballot to and from the voting official's office to add accountability in the vote-by-mail process.

=== Ballot Scout ===
Created by non-profit Democracy Works their website democracy.works/ballot-scout claims to help USPS use Intelligent Mail barcodes to absentee ballots. With this and their notification network, they give voters and officials updates on their ballot's status.
