= Postal voting =

Voting, election, ballot papers, distributed to electors or returned by post, mail

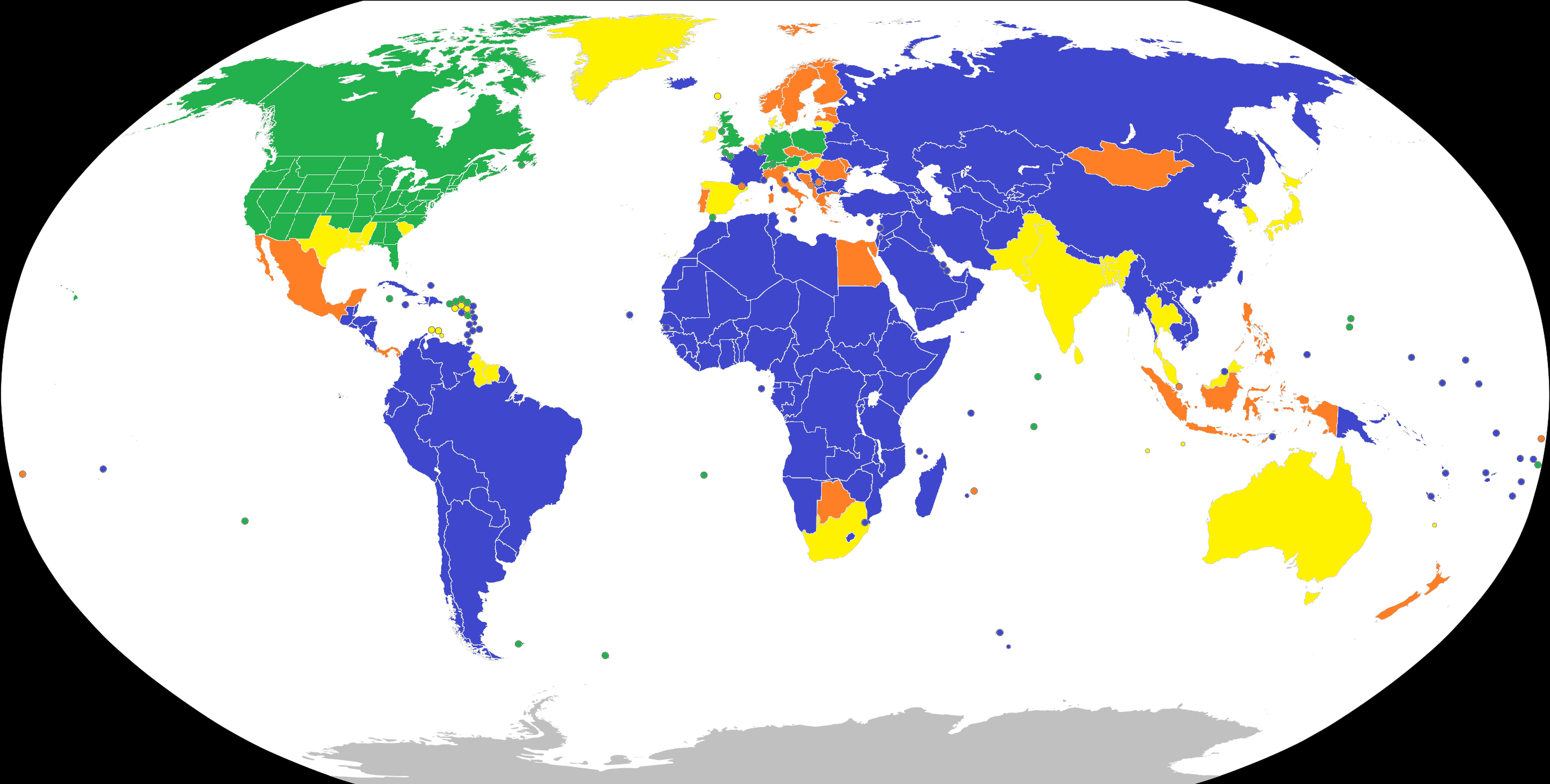
Postal voting available only for some/all citizens abroad Postal voting available for some/all citizens abroad, and for citizens at home meeting certain conditions Postal voting available for all citizens on demand No postal voting system in place

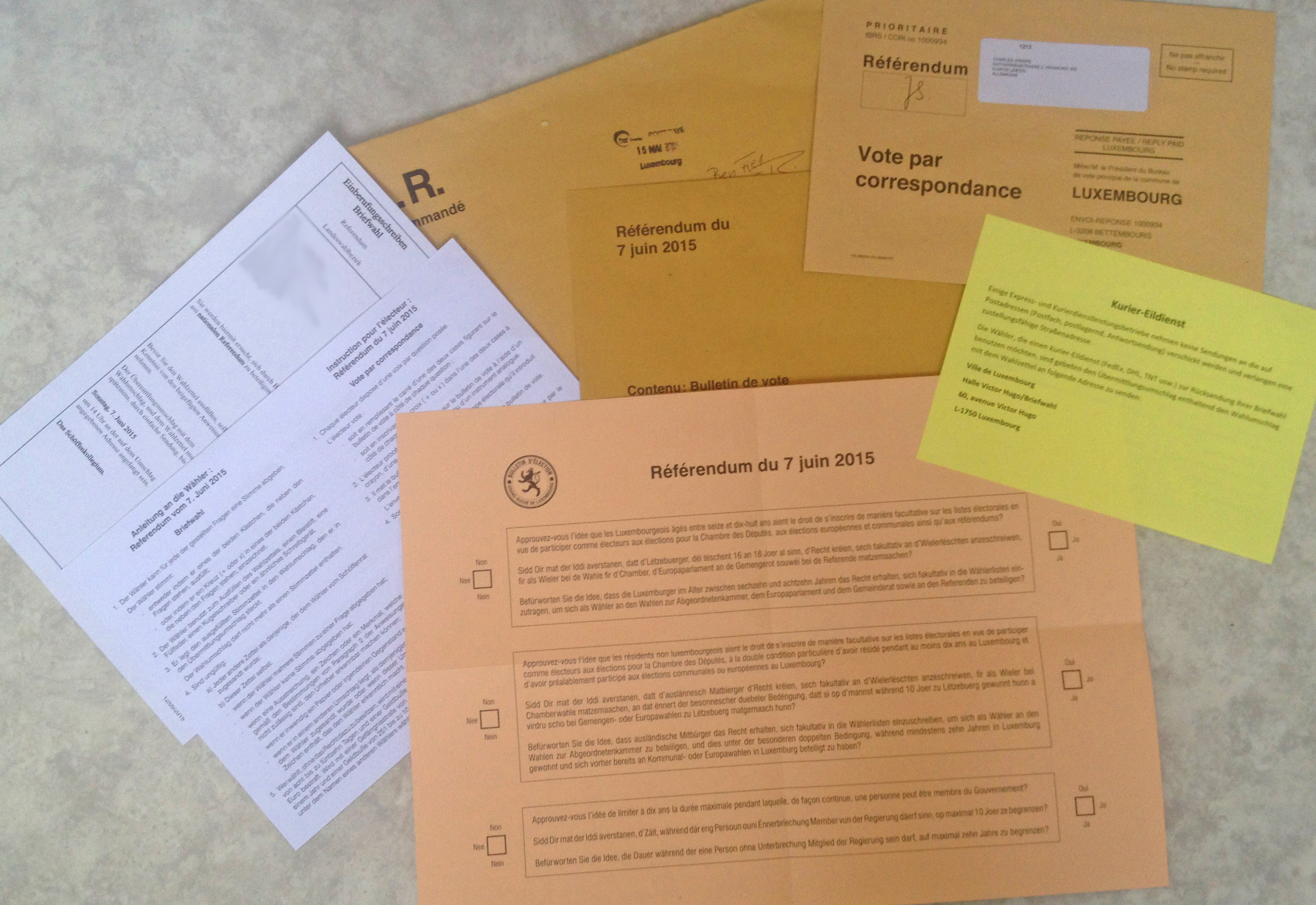
Ballot and other documents for postal voting for the 2015 Luxembourg constitutional referendum

Postal voting is voting in an election where ballot papers are distributed to electors (and typically returned) by post, in contrast to electors voting in person at a polling station or electronically via an electronic voting system.

In an election, postal votes may be available on demand or limited to individuals meeting certain criteria, such as a proven inability to travel to a designated polling place. Most electors are required to apply for a postal vote, although some may receive one by default. In some elections postal voting is the only voting method allowed and is referred to as all-postal voting. With the exception of those elections, postal votes constitute a form of early voting and may be considered an absentee ballot.

Typically, postal votes must be mailed back before the scheduled election day. However, in some jurisdictions return methods may allow for dropping off the ballot in person via secure drop boxes or at voting centers. Postal votes may be processed by hand or scanned and counted electronically. The history of postal voting dates back to the 19th century, and modern-day procedures and availability vary by jurisdiction. Research, focused on the United States and using data from states where postal voting is widely available—California, Oregon and Washington—shows that the availability of postal voting tends to increase voter turnout.

Electoral laws typically stipulate a series of checks to protect against voter fraud and allow for the integrity and secrecy of the submitted ballot to be maintained. Known instances of fraud are very rare. Coordinated, large-scale fraud by postal voting is likely hard to pull off undetected because the large number of interested parties (such as officials, political operators, and journalists) as well as a large number of scholars and analysts who are capable of detecting statistical outliers in vote totals signifying large-scale fraud. Officials can confirm instances of fraud by checking signatures and conducting basic detective work. Undue influence and coercion through family voting has been under-reported.

== All-postal voting ==
All-postal voting is a form of postal voting in which all electors receive their ballot papers through the post, not just those who requested an absentee ballot. Depending on the country, electors may have to return their ballot papers by post or they may be allowed to deliver them by hand to specified drop-off locations. All-postal voting is used in several states in the United States and in Switzerland, and was used in 2016 in the Australian Marriage Law Postal Survey as well as in four regions of the United Kingdom in the 2004 European Parliament election.

There is some evidence that all-postal voting leads to higher turnout than in-person voting or mail-in voting that requires voters to first request a ballot (rather than receive it automatically).

== By country ==
=== Australia ===
At the 2016 Australian federal election, there were 1.2 million postal votes cast, amounting to 8.5 percent of total votes.

Postal voting in Australia was introduced for federal elections in 1902, and first used at the 1903 election. It was abolished by the Fisher government in 1910, following claims that it was open to abuse and biased towards rural voters. The Cook government's bill to restore postal voting was one of the "triggers" for the double dissolution prior to the 1914 election. Postal voting was eventually restored by the Hughes government in 1918 and has not been challenged since, although the provisions and requirements have been amended on a number of occasions.

Prior to Federation in 1901, Western Australia introduced a form of postal voting in 1877 with strict eligibility criteria. South Australia introduced postal voting for seamen in 1890, and a further act in 1896 gave postal votes to any elector who would be more than 15 miles (24 km) from home on election day, as well as for any woman unable to travel "by reason of her health". Victoria passed a similar law in 1899, and the first federal postal voting legislation was also modelled on the 1896 South Australian act.

==== Procedure ====
Postal voting at a federal level is governed by the Commonwealth Electoral Act 1918 and administered by the Australian Electoral Commission (AEC). Postal votes are available to those who will be absent from their electoral division through travel, or who those are unable to attend a polling booth due to illness, infirmity, "approaching childbirth", caring responsibilities, reasonable fears for their safety, religious beliefs, imprisonment, status as a silent elector, or employment reasons.

Eligible voters may make a postal vote application (PVA) prior to each election, or apply for status as a "general postal voter" and receive a postal ballot automatically. Postal voters receive their ballot(s) and a prepaid envelope containing their name and address, as well as a predetermined security question from the PVA. Voters are required to sign the envelope and provide the correct answer to the security question. They are also required to have a witness sign and date the envelope. As of 2016, postal votes were able to be received and entered into the count up to 13 days after election day. Following the 2016 election, it was observed that the strict scrutiny process afforded to postal votes was a "significant contributor" to delays in declaring the results of close elections.

=== Austria ===
Austria enabled postal voting in 2007 by amending Article 26 of the Constitution of Austria. Electors request an electoral card that can be completed in person or in private and sent via post. In the 2017 election, roughly 780,000 postal ballots were cast representing 15% of all ballots. In 2019, this number has increased to 1,070,000.

=== Bangladesh ===
The interim government introduced reforms before the election in 2026, whereby expatriates could vote through a postal ballot.

=== Canada ===
The ability to vote when in-person voting is not possible was first introduced with the federal Military Voters Act in 1917, giving all Canadian soldiers and their spouses the right to vote. Public servants became eligible in 1970. The right was further extended to civilian support personnel on Canadian Forces bases in the 1977. In 1993, Bill C-114 extended the special ballot vote (Special Voting Rules) by mail to all Canadian citizens.

Use of special voting rules, including mail voting, has grown with each election. In the 42nd general election (2015), the number of voters increased by 117 percent over the previous election to roughly 619,000. This number grew to roughly 660,000 in the 43rd election (2019) representing 3.6 percent of electors.

=== Czech Republic ===
Postal voting was introduced to the Czech Republic in 2024 via act nom. 268/2024 of Civil Code. Electors can request voting materials on diplomatic missions abroad. First elections where the postal voting was conducted are The 2025 parliamentary elections.

Czech citizens living abroad are allowed to use postal vote in Elections to the Chamber of Deputies, Presidential elections and European Parliamentary Elections.

=== Denmark ===
In Denmark, the term "brevstemme" literally means postal voting and refers to a possibility of voting in advance in a different municipality than the home municipality, and then the vote is sent by post to the home municipality for counting.

=== Finland ===
Finland introduced vote by post in 2019 for eligible voters living permanently abroad and eligible voters staying abroad at the time of the elections.

=== France ===
Postal voting existed in France until 1975, when it was banned (except in very limited circumstances) due to fears of voter fraud. The highly publicized use of widespread postal voting in the 2020 United States presidential election has reignited debate in France about the use of postal voting, but no consensus or concrete plans exist for reintroducing it.

=== Germany ===
Postal voting is common in Germany, with almost 18.5 million voters, 37% of the electorate, voting by post in the 2025 federal election. Absentee voting has existed in Germany since 1957, originally to ensure that all German citizens, especially the old, sick, and disabled, and citizens living abroad, have the opportunity to participate in elections. At first, postal voters had to state why they could not cast their vote in person on Election Day; but this requirement was dropped in 2008, allowing everyone to use postal voting. Like in many other countries, in more recent years voting by mail has become increasingly popular among younger and non-disabled citizens residing within the country.

=== Greece ===
Prime Minister Kyriakos Mitsotakis announced that postal voting will be used in the European Parliament Elections on June 9, 2024. He also said that the adoption of this option in European Parliament elections serves as a precursor to its implementation in national elections, which will be held in 2027

=== Hungary ===
Hungarian citizens living abroad who do not have an official address in Hungary are allowed to vote by mail. They are only allowed to vote for party lists, but not for local representatives. In the last parliamentary election in 2018, 267,233 votes (4.6% of all votes) were submitted via mail. 48% of all valid postal votes were submitted from Romania.

=== India ===
Postal voting in India is done only through the Electronically Transmitted Postal Ballot Papers (ETPB) system of Election Commission of India, where ballot papers are distributed to the registered eligible voters and they return the votes by post. When the counting of votes commences, these postal votes are counted first before the counting of votes from the electronic voting machines of all other voters. Only certain categories of people are eligible to register as postal voters. People working in the union armed forces and state police as well as their wives, and employees working for the Government of India who are officially posted abroad can register for the postal vote, these are also called service voters. Additionally, people in preventive detention, disabled and those above the age of 65 years old can use postal vote. Prisoners can not vote at all. Media persons too have been allowed to use the postal ballot to cast their vote. The Communist Party of India (Marxist) has alleged that postal ballots "will adversely effect the verifiability of a large number of voters, thus, transparency and integrity of the process", and expressed concerns with "instances of manipulation and malpractice" with postal ballots.

=== Indonesia ===
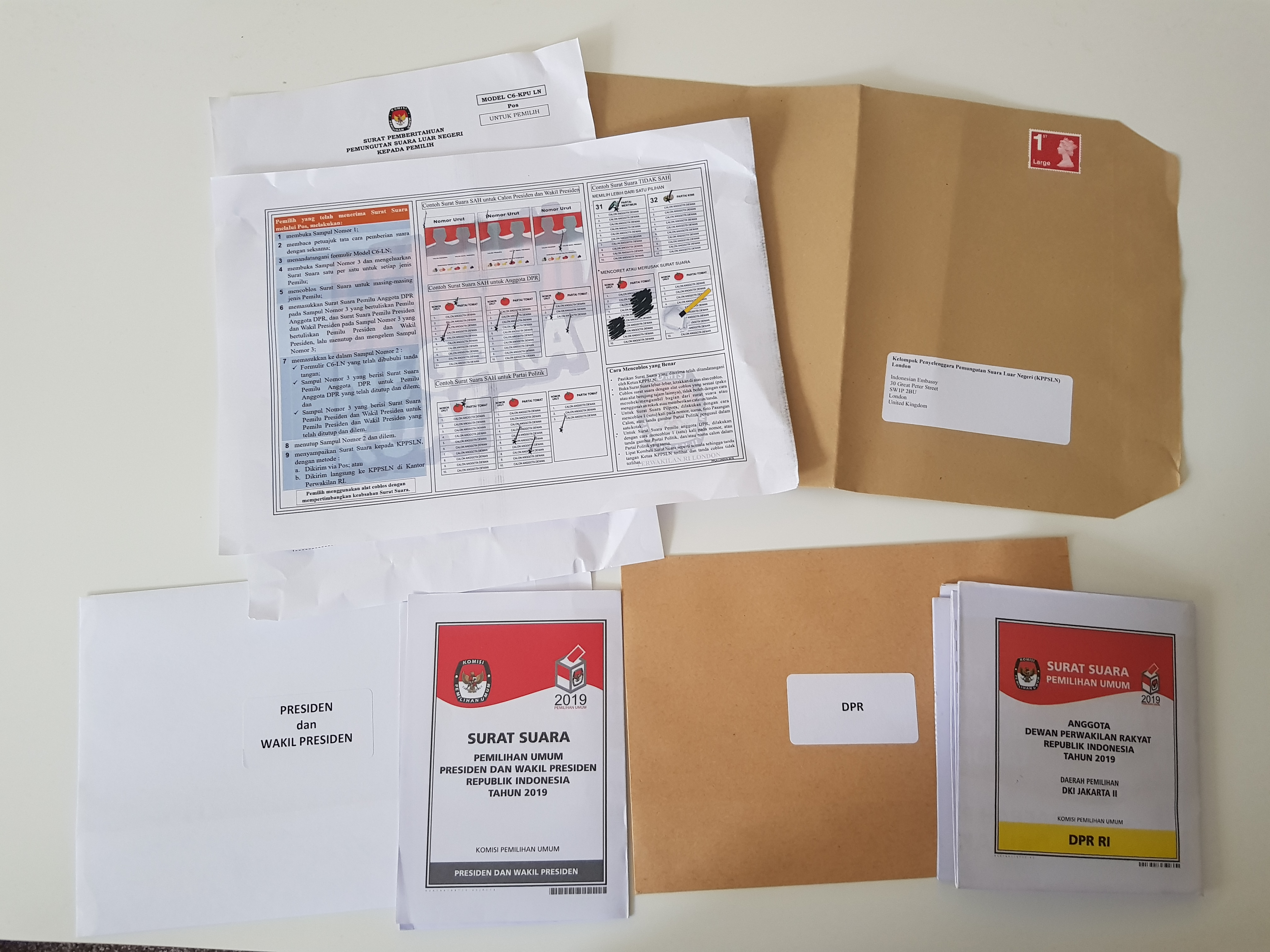
Postal voting documents sent to an Indonesian voter in the United Kingdom during the 2019 Indonesian general election

Eligible Indonesians living abroad are able to vote by mail in national elections by registering at the Indonesian overseas election commission in their country of residence. Beside presidential elections, they are also able to vote in DPR elections. All overseas Indonesian voters are included in the Jakarta 2nd constituency, which also contains Central and South Jakarta.

=== Italy ===
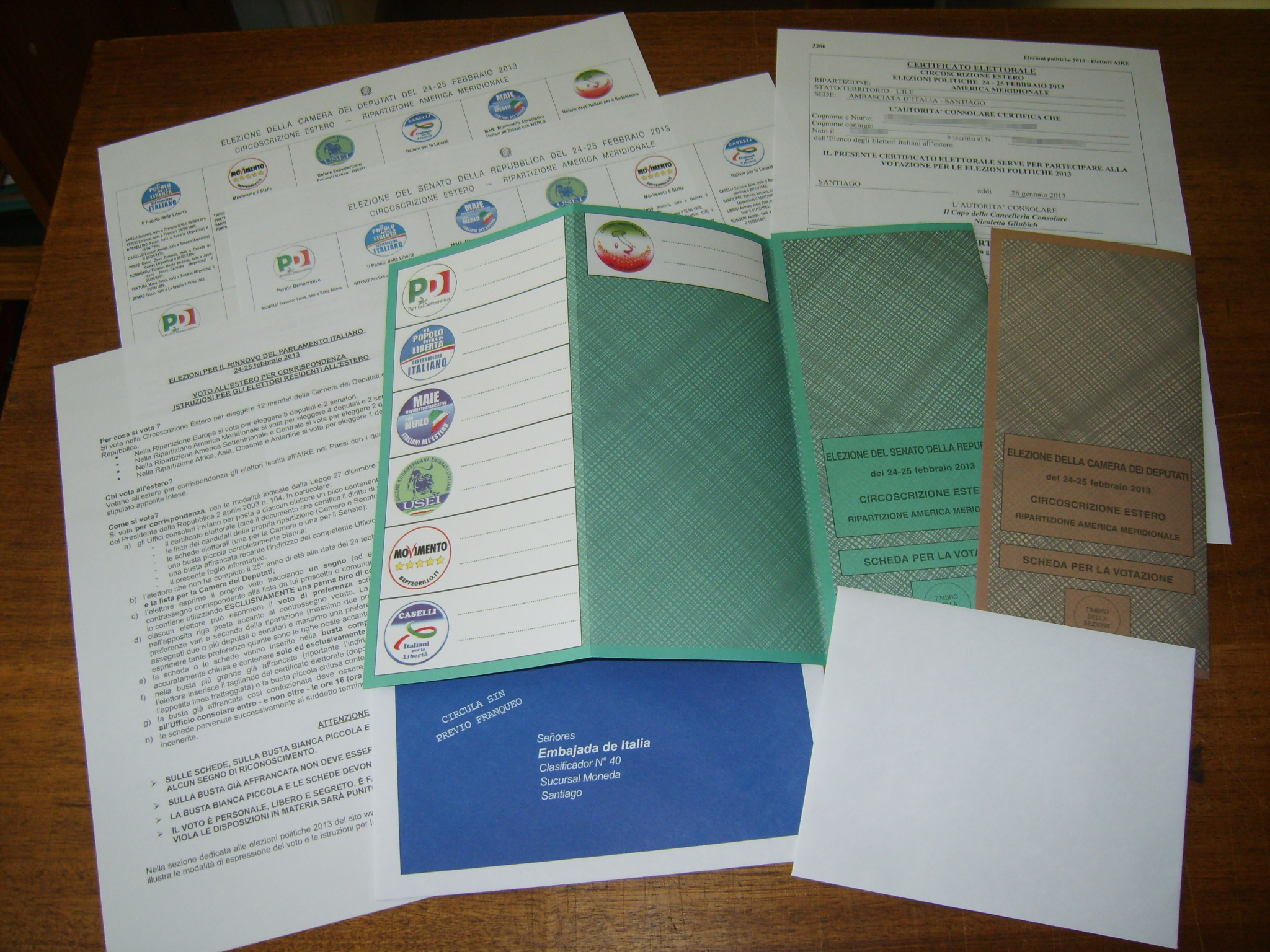
Electoral package sent to an Italian voter in South America during the 2013 Italian general election

Since 2001 Italian citizens living abroad have the right to vote by mail in all referendums and national elections being held in Italy (provided they had registered their residence abroad with their relevant consulate).

=== Malaysia ===
In Malaysia, opposition leader and former deputy prime minister Anwar Ibrahim alleged that postal votes have been used by the ruling Barisan Nasional coalition in securing seats in certain constituencies. He also said that in one particular constituency (Setiawangsa), he claimed that his Parti Keadilan Rakyat had actually won during the 2008 elections, before 14,000 postal votes came in awarding the incumbent BN parliamentarian the seat with a majority of 8,000 votes. In Malaysia, only teachers, military personnel, and policemen based away from their constituencies are eligible to submit postal votes.

=== Mexico ===
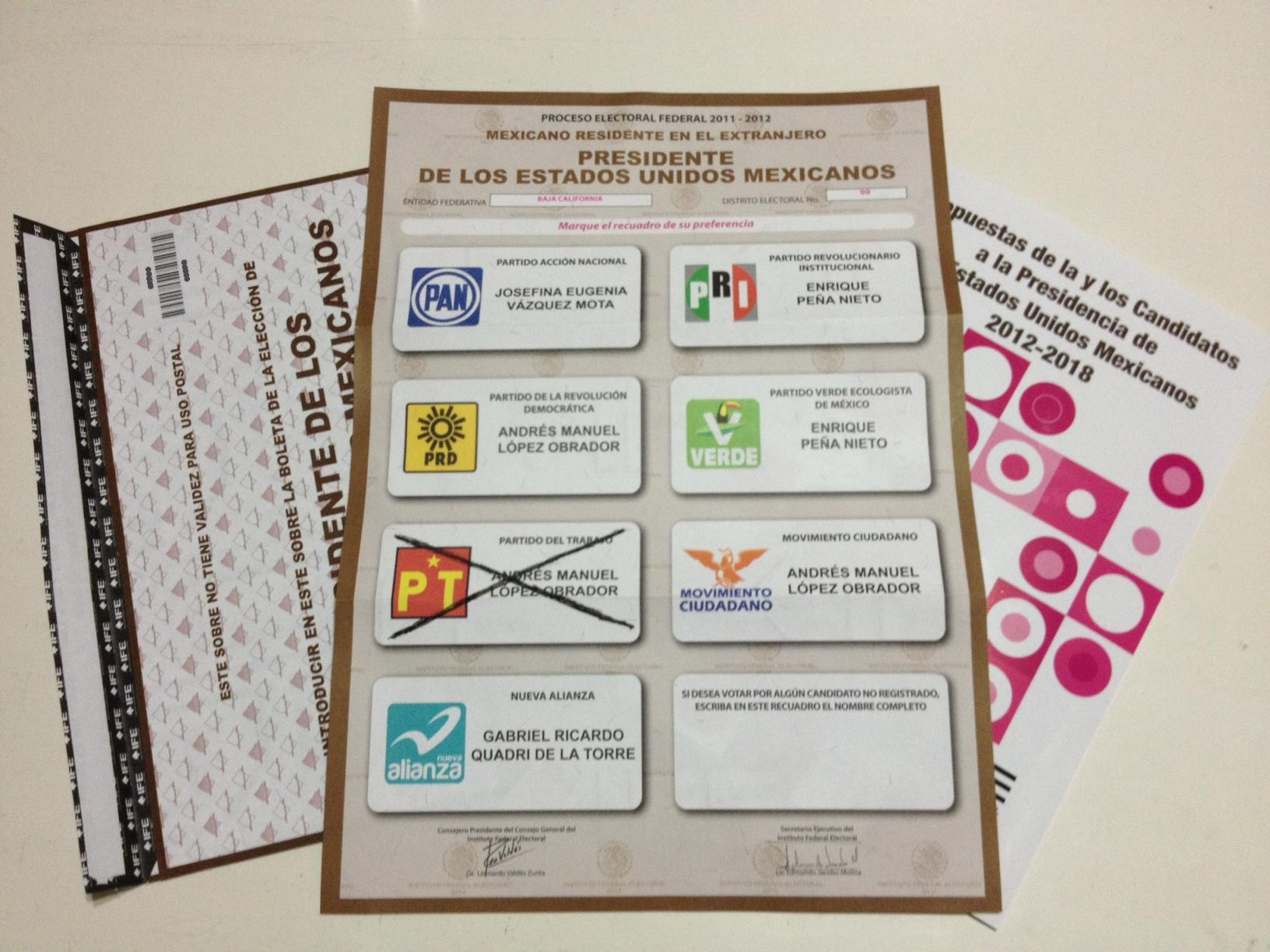
Postal ballot paper for Mexico federal election 2012

In Mexico, since the 2006 federal elections, postal voting for people living abroad has been permitted. A request can be made to the National Electoral Institute which then sends the ballots outside the country.

=== Norway ===
Postal voting is accepted for voters who are staying abroad and are not close to a foreign station or other voting place. Voters can request ballots to be sent to them. Voters are also allowed to write their own ballots.

=== Philippines ===
Mail-in ballots are an option for Overseas Filipinos in select countries only. The general practise for local and overseas absentee voting in Philippine elections requires that ballots be cast in person at select polling places, such as a consulate office.

=== Poland ===
Postal voting (głosowanie korespondencyjne) is available to all Polish citizens on demand who declare and justify their absence during an election at a designated state council, institution or government website. The reason for absence comprises infirmity, disability, age (for citizens aged 60 and over), or if a person eligible to cast a ballot is currently placed under quarantine or isolation.

=== Singapore ===
Singaporean citizens living abroad may vote by post in presidential and parliamentary elections.

=== Slovakia ===
Postal voting in Slovakia was introduced in 2004. Slovak citizens living or stationed abroad can use it on demand to participate in Parliamentary elections and national referendums. When using postal voting the voters abroad are assigned to special districts. One special district usually corresponds to about 4000 voters.

The first elections when postal voting was conducted in Slovakia were the 2006 Parliamentary election.

In February 2026 Erik Kaliňák (SMER-SD) stated that Fico's Cabinet is conducting preparations to abolish postal voting for Slovak citizens abroad and replace it with the possibility to vote in person at Slovak embassies.

=== Spain ===
In Spain, for European, general, regional and municipal elections, voters who will be absent from their town on election day or are ill or disabled, may request a postal vote at a post office. The application must be submitted personally or through a representative in case of illness or disability certified by a medical certificate.

=== Sweden ===
Swedish citizens living abroad may vote by post.

=== Switzerland ===
Swiss federal law allows postal voting in all federal elections and referendums, and all cantons also allow it for cantonal ballot issues. All voters receive their personal ballot by mail and may either cast it at a polling station or mail it back. As of 2019, approximately 90% of Swiss voters cast ballots using Remote Postal Voting.

=== United Kingdom ===
Absentee voting in the United Kingdom is allowed by proxy or post (known as postal voting on demand) for any elector. Postal voting does not require a reason, apart from in Northern Ireland, where postal voting is available only if it would be unreasonable to expect a voter to go to a polling station on polling day as a result of employment, disability or education restrictions. Postal voting is common in the United Kingdom; 8.4 million postal votes were issued, 18% of the UK electorate (18.2% England, 19.4% Scotland, 19.4% Wales and 1.9% N.Ireland) in the 2017 general election.

Proxy voting is allowed for people who will be away, working, or medically disabled, anyone eligible to vote in the election may be a proxy for close relatives and two unrelated people. The proxy voter for an elector can also be a postal voter, known as Postal Proxy voting. If a person becomes unable to vote in person within 6 days of an election, including up to 5 pm on the polling day, they can apply for another person to vote on their behalf as an emergency proxy.

Postal voting in the UK has been (allegedly) subject to fraud, undue influence, theft and tampering; other forms of voting have also been subject to fraud. The number of cases reported to or by the Electoral Commission however is low. "[T]hese concerns need to be balanced by the fact that it is entirely legitimate for political parties to encourage electors to vote, be it in person or by post".

=== United States ===
The percentage of American voters who vote by mail or absentee ballots more than tripled since 1996.

No-excuse postal voting: All-mail voting No-excuse absentee voting Excuse-needed absentee voting

In the United States, postal voting (commonly referred to as mail-in voting, vote-by-mail or vote from home) is a process in which a ballot is mailed to the home of a registered voter, who fills it out and returns it via postal mail or by dropping it off in-person at a voting center or into a secure drop box. Deadlines are set under state law, with some states requiring ballots be received by election day and others allowing ballots to be received after election day so long as they are postmarked by election day. Vote-by-mail is available in both Republican and Democratic states, with research showing that the availability of postal voting increases voter turnout. Five states—Colorado, Hawaii, Oregon, Utah and Washington—hold elections almost entirely by mail.

It has been argued that postal voting has a greater risk of fraud than in-person voting, though there are few known instances of such fraud. Mail-in ballots pose other challenges, including signature verification, prompt delivery of ballots, and issues that have led to evidence suggesting younger voters, as well as voters from racial and ethnic minorities, are more likely to have their vote-by-mail ballots rejected.

In the 2016 general election, approximately 33 million postal ballots were cast, about a quarter of all ballots cast. Some jurisdictions used only vote-by-mail and others used absentee voting by mail.

In April 2020, during lockdowns for the COVID-19 pandemic, an NBC News/Wall Street Journal poll found that 58% of those polled would favor nationwide election reform to allow everyone to vote by mail. In the November 2020 presidential election, postal voting was an encouraged voting method in many locations due to the coronavirus pandemic. A poll by Pew Research Center found that 54% of people voted in person in the 2020 election compared to 46% who voted absentee or mail in. Despite the long history of postal voting and a large number of postal votes in the 2016 election, President Donald Trump has cast doubt on the integrity of unsolicited mail-in voting in the 2020 election. There is little evidence to support Trump's claim that postal voting enables widespread election fraud.

Following false claims of widespread voter fraud in the 2020 presidential election, Republican state lawmakers began an effort to roll back access to postal voting.

== See also ==
- Absentee ballot
- Ballot tracking in the United States
- Non-resident citizen voting
- Representation of the People Act
- Secret ballot
