= Joint Board =

Joint Board may refer to:

== Government ==
- Joint-board, a component of Local government in England
- Taith Joint Board, a joint committee of the six north Wales county authorities legally constituted for the purpose of developing and implementing actions and strategies for transport in north Wales
- Valuation joint board, a public body in Scotland responsible for property valuations for local tax purposes across multiple council areas

== Military ==
- Army and Navy Joint Board, a predecessor of the U.S. military's Joint Chiefs of Staff
- Joint Airborne Troop Board, a multi-service U.S. military board tasked with creating doctrine, tactics, techniques, and procedures for joint airborne operations and aerial logistical support operations that existed from 1951 to 1956
- Permanent Joint Board on Defense, the joint American-Canadian senior advisory body on the continental military defense of North America

== Education ==
- Joint Admissions and Matriculation Board, a Nigerian entrance examination board for tertiary-level institutions
- Joint Examining Board, a board offering qualifications to support information and communication technologies (ICT) teaching and the skills development of staff in the United Kingdom
- Joint Matriculation Board, an examination board that operated in England, Wales, and Northern Ireland between 1903 and 1992
- West Bengal Joint Entrance Examinations Board, an entrance examination authority in West Bengal in India

== Other ==
- Joint Board for the Enrollment of Actuaries, a board which licenses actuaries to perform a variety of actuarial tasks required of pension plans in the United States
- Joint Board on Interstate Highways, which created a rationalized and standardized United States Numbered Highway System
- Joint Policy Board for Mathematics, a board of mathematical societies in the United States
- SHMD Joint Board, a defunct public transport and electricity supply organisation in the United Kingdom
