= Postal voting in the United States =

Overview of topic

The percentage of American voters who vote by mail or absentee ballots more than tripled since 1996.

A 2024 Voice of America video about postal voting in the United States

No-excuse postal voting: All-mail voting No-excuse absentee voting Excuse-needed absentee voting

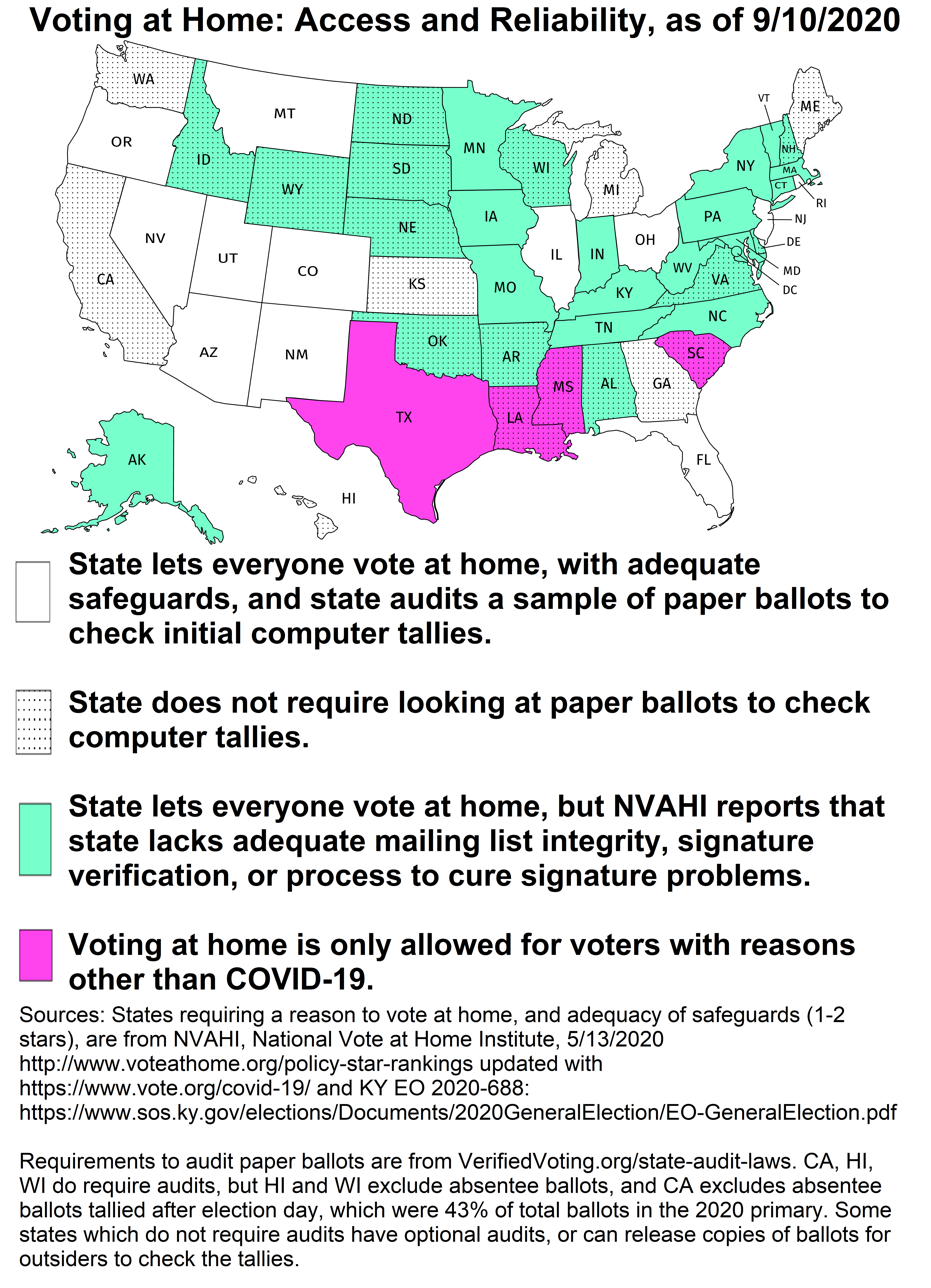
Early voting in U.S. states in 2020

Postal voting in the United States, also referred to as mail-in voting or vote by mail, is a form of absentee ballot in the United States. A ballot is mailed to the home of a registered voter, who fills it out and returns it by postal mail or drops it off in-person at a secure drop box or voting center. Postal voting reduces staff requirements at polling centers during an election. All-mail elections can save money, while a mix of voting options can cost more. In some states, ballots may be sent by the Postal Service without prepayment of postage.

The availability of postal voting increases voter turnout. As of 2022, eight states – California, Colorado, Hawaii, Nevada, Oregon, Utah, Vermont, and Washington – allow all elections to be conducted by mail. Five of these states – Colorado, Hawaii, Oregon, Utah, and Washington – hold elections "almost entirely by mail." Postal voting is an option in 33 states and the District of Columbia. Other states allow postal voting only in certain circumstances, though the COVID-19 pandemic in 2020 prompted further discussion about relaxing some of those restrictions.

There have been campaigns by both US politicians and foreign actors to undermine trust in mail-in voting with claims of widespread fraud. Election fraud in general is very rare in the United States, and although absentee-ballot fraud is more common than other forms, there were only 491 cases between 2000 and 2012, out of billions of votes cast. After repeatedly asserting that mail-in voting would result in widespread fraud in the run up to the 2020 United States presidential election, President Donald Trump indicated he would block funding for the Postal Service to ensure that postal votes would be processed securely or on time. Russia has also amplified criticisms of vote-by-mail in the US. Spurred on by Trump's false claims of fraud, other Republican lawmakers initiated a push to roll back access to postal voting. In June 2026, the U.S. Supreme Court struck down a Republican-led effort to bar mail in voting ballots from being counted after election days are held.

Rejection of legal mail-in ballots is a more significant challenge than fraud, involving ballots being discarded for reasons such as signature-related technicalities.

== Process ==
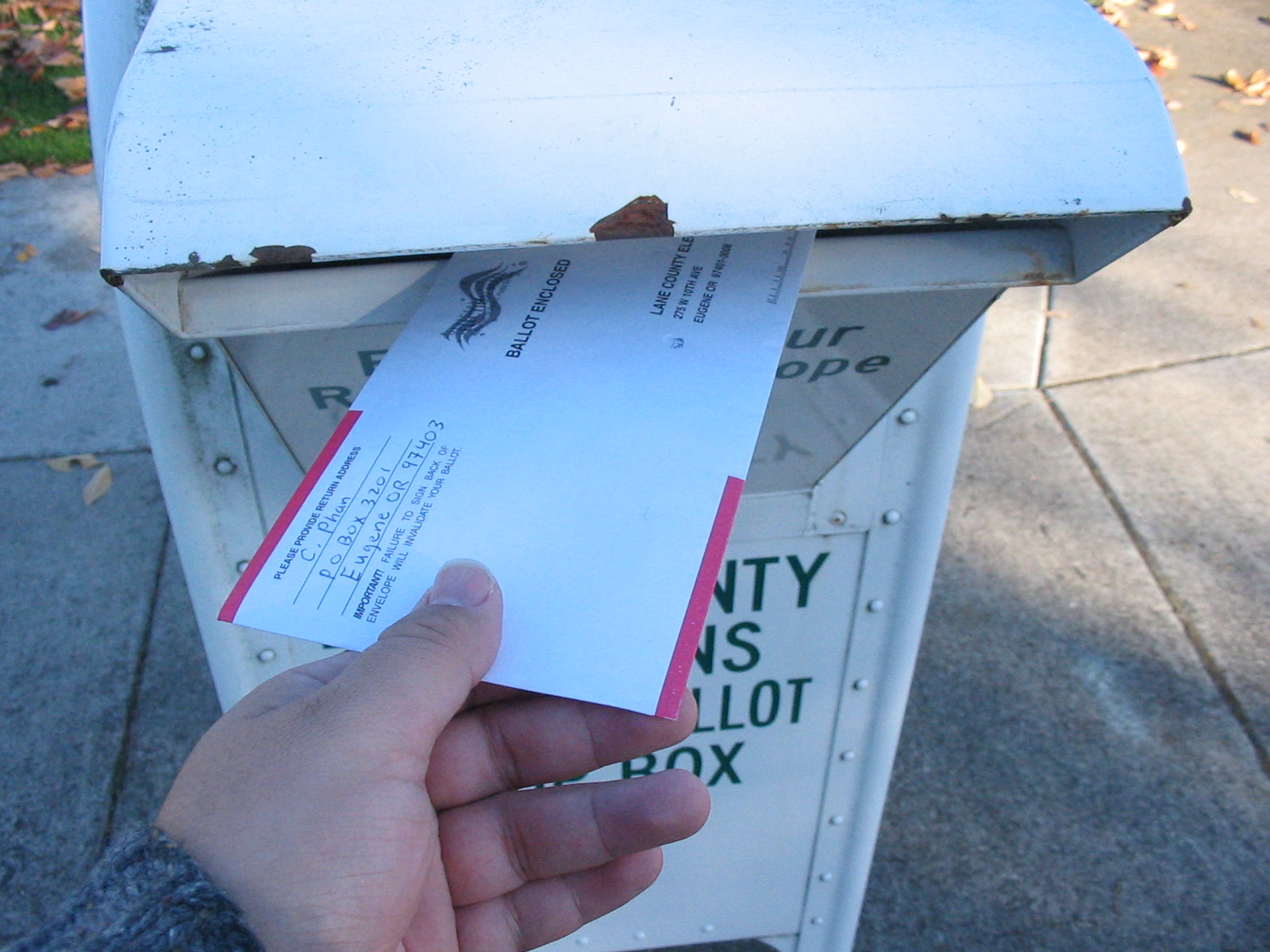
A vote-by-mail ballot being placed in a ballot drop box

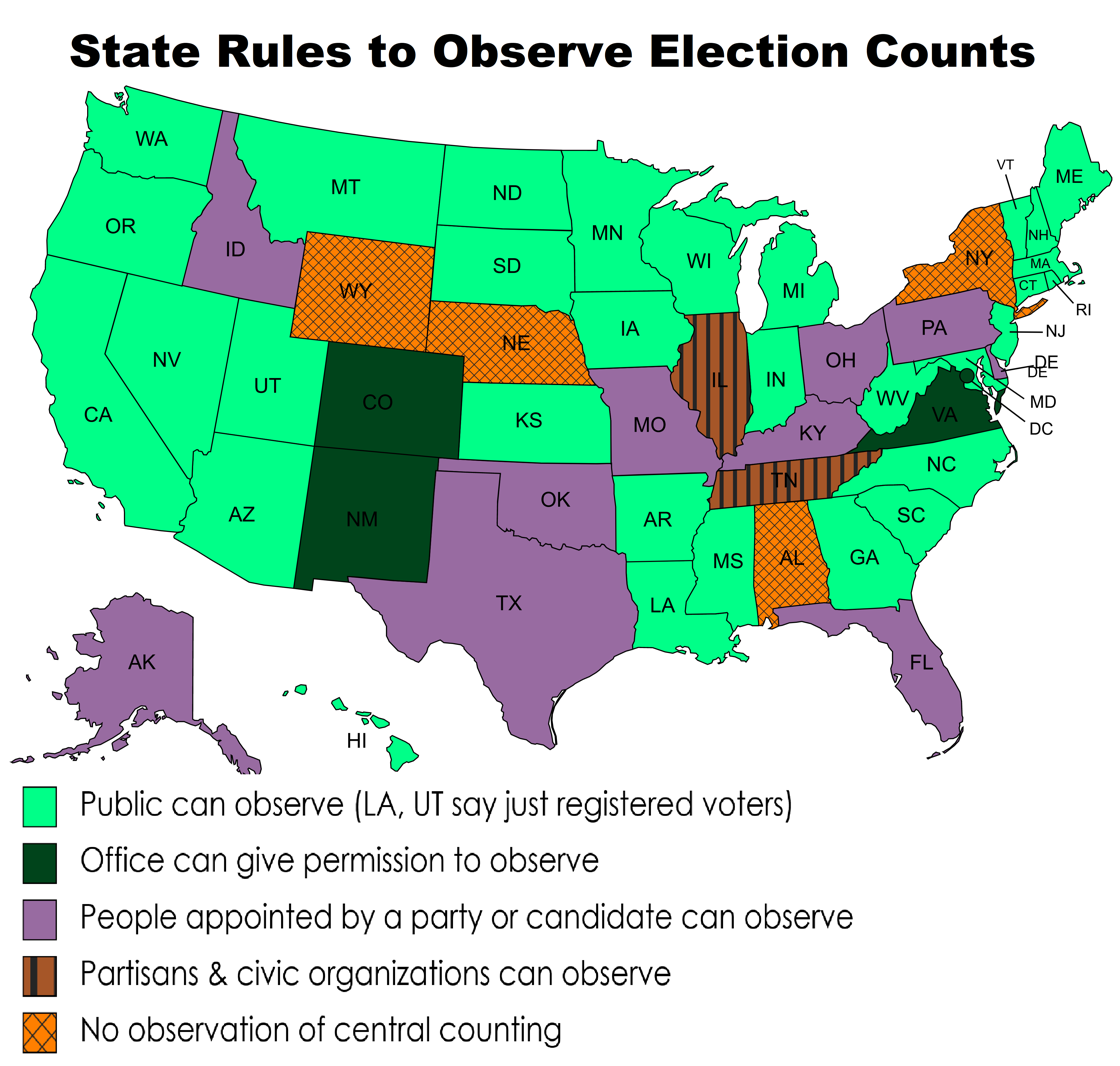
Election observers

Postal voting was initially intended for voters unable to go to the polling place on Election Day. Some states now allow mail-in ballots for convenience, but some still refer to them as absentee ballots. Some states that require an approved excuse to vote by mail allow voters with permanent disabilities apply for permanent absentee voter status, and some others allow all citizens to apply for permanent status so they will automatically receive an absentee ballot for each election. In others, a voter must apply for an absentee ballot before each election.

Ballots or applications for postal ballots are sent out before the election date, by a margin that depends on state law. In some states, a voter's pamphlet is also distributed. The election office prints a unique barcode on the return envelope provided for each ballot, so processing of each envelope can be tracked, sometimes publicly, and corresponding signature files can be loaded quickly to check the voter's signature on the envelope when it returns. Voters who lose the return envelope can still vote by obtaining another envelope from election officials, or in some jurisdictions by using a plain envelope.

To vote by mail, an individual marks the ballot for their choice of the candidates (or writes in their name), places it in the provided mailing envelope, seals it and signs and dates the back of the mailing envelope. Some jurisdictions use one envelope or privacy sleeve inside an outer envelope, for privacy. The envelope containing the ballot is then either mailed, or dropped off at a local ballot collection center.

The deadline is determined by state law. In some jurisdictions, postmarks are not counted, and ballots must be received by a certain time on election day. In other jurisdictions, a ballot must have a postmark on or before the day of the election and be received prior to the date of certification. Many vote-by-mail jurisdictions enlist the help of volunteers to take ballots in walk-up drop off booths or drive-up quick drop locations. The Help America Vote Act requires some polling options, often at central election headquarters, with voting machines designed for disabled people.

It is sometimes inaccurately claimed that absentee ballots are not counted unless the race is close; in fact, all valid absentee ballots are counted in every election and jurisdiction, even if they will not affect the outcome of an election. Counting of absentee ballots is usually done centrally. States vary in the rules about who may observe the counting. In New Hampshire, absentee ballots are sorted and transported to polling places for counting.

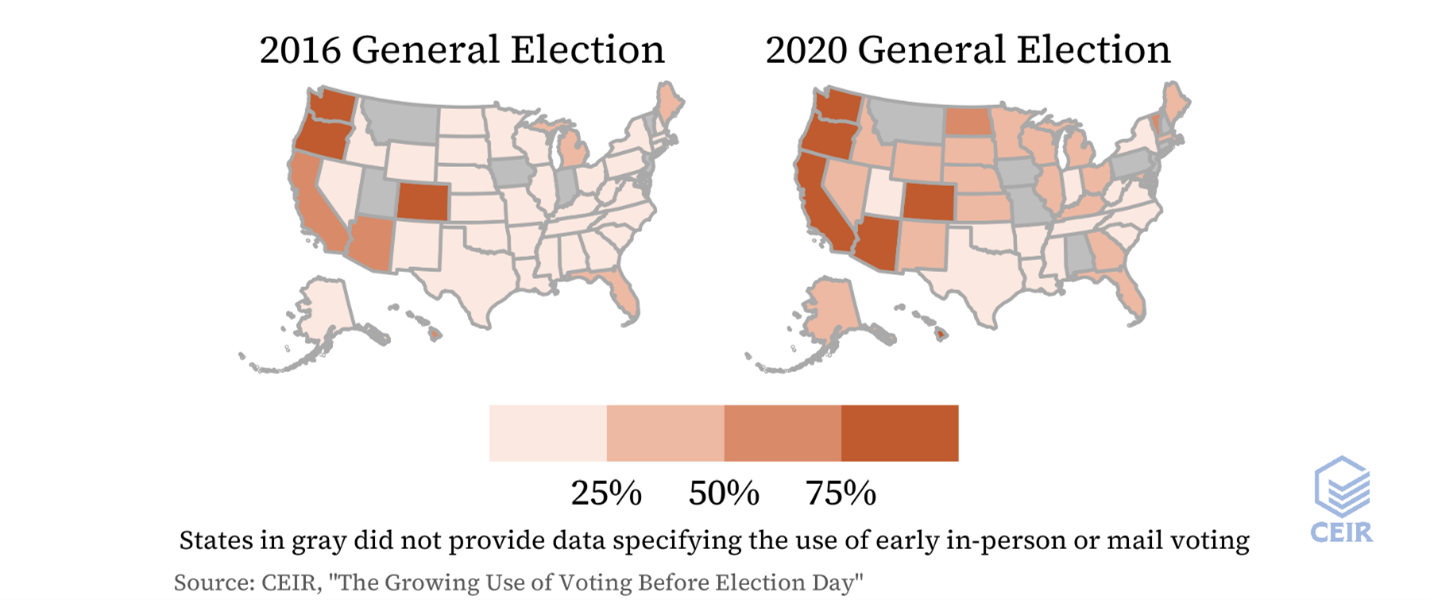
Proportion of votes cast by mail voting

In the 2016 US Presidential election, approximately 33 million ballots were cast by postal vote, about a quarter of all ballots cast. In 2020, an estimated 42% of votes were conducted through mail-in voting. Some jurisdictions used only vote-by-mail and others absentee votes.

In April 2020, during lockdowns for the coronavirus pandemic, an NBC News/Wall Street Journal poll found that 58% of American voters would favor nationwide election reform to allow everyone to vote by mail, and another 9% (total 67%) favor allowing it this year because of COVID-19. Pew Research found at the same time that 49% of Republicans and 87% of Democrats supported this measure.

=== Pre-processing of mail-in ballots ===
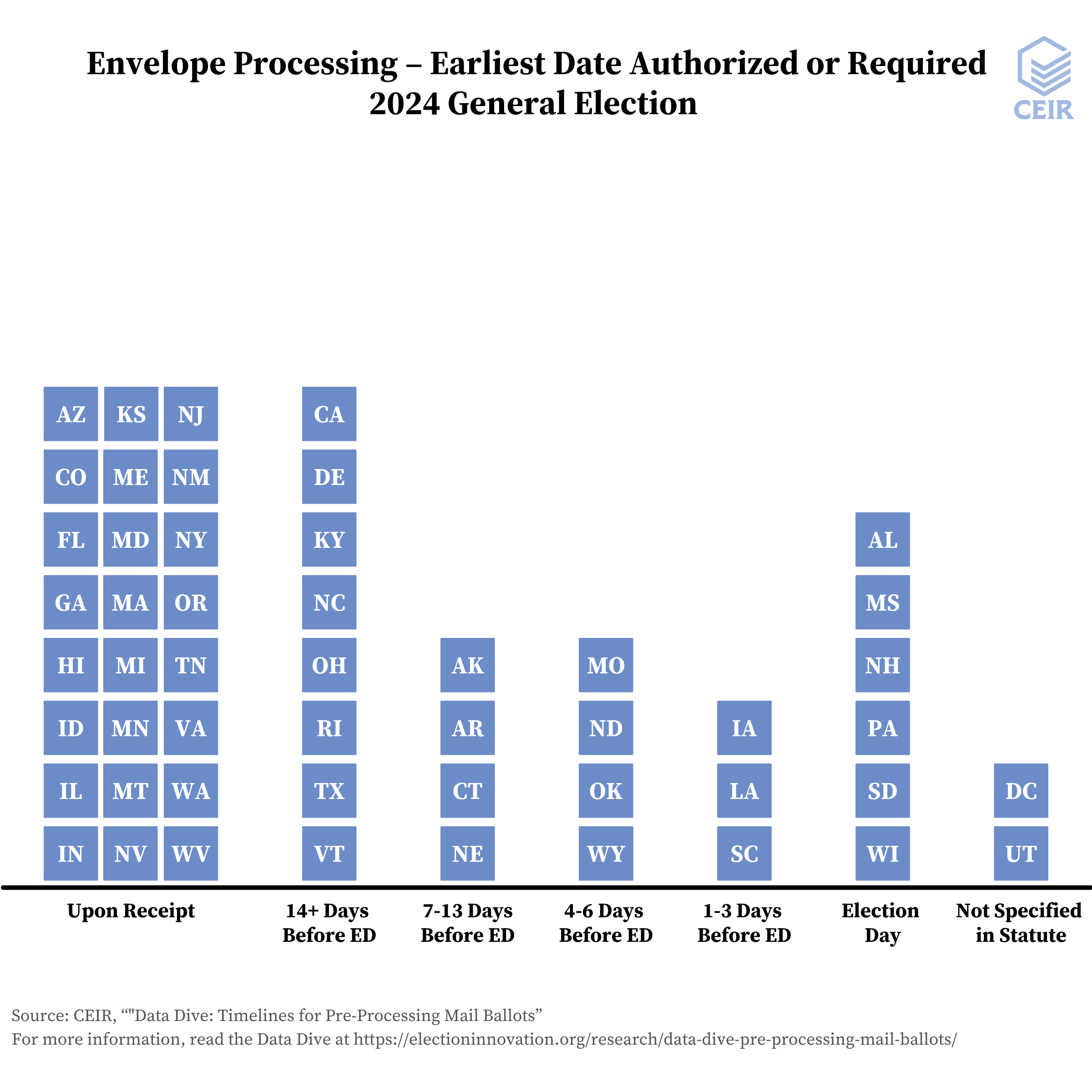
Earliest date election workers are allowed to process mail ballot envelopes.

One variable with a significant impact on both the speed of election reporting and public perception of election processes involves when processing of mail-in ballots is allowed to begin.

Forty-three states begin preparing mail or absentee ballots for counting before Election Day. This practice of pre-processing gives election officials more time to detect and address errors or irregularities in the ballots and to notify voters about ballots in need of correction (called curing the ballot).

States that do not allow pre-processing—including Pennsylvania and Wisconsin—require officials to wait until Election Day to begin mail-in ballot verification and curing. This often delays the release of election results until several days after polls close.

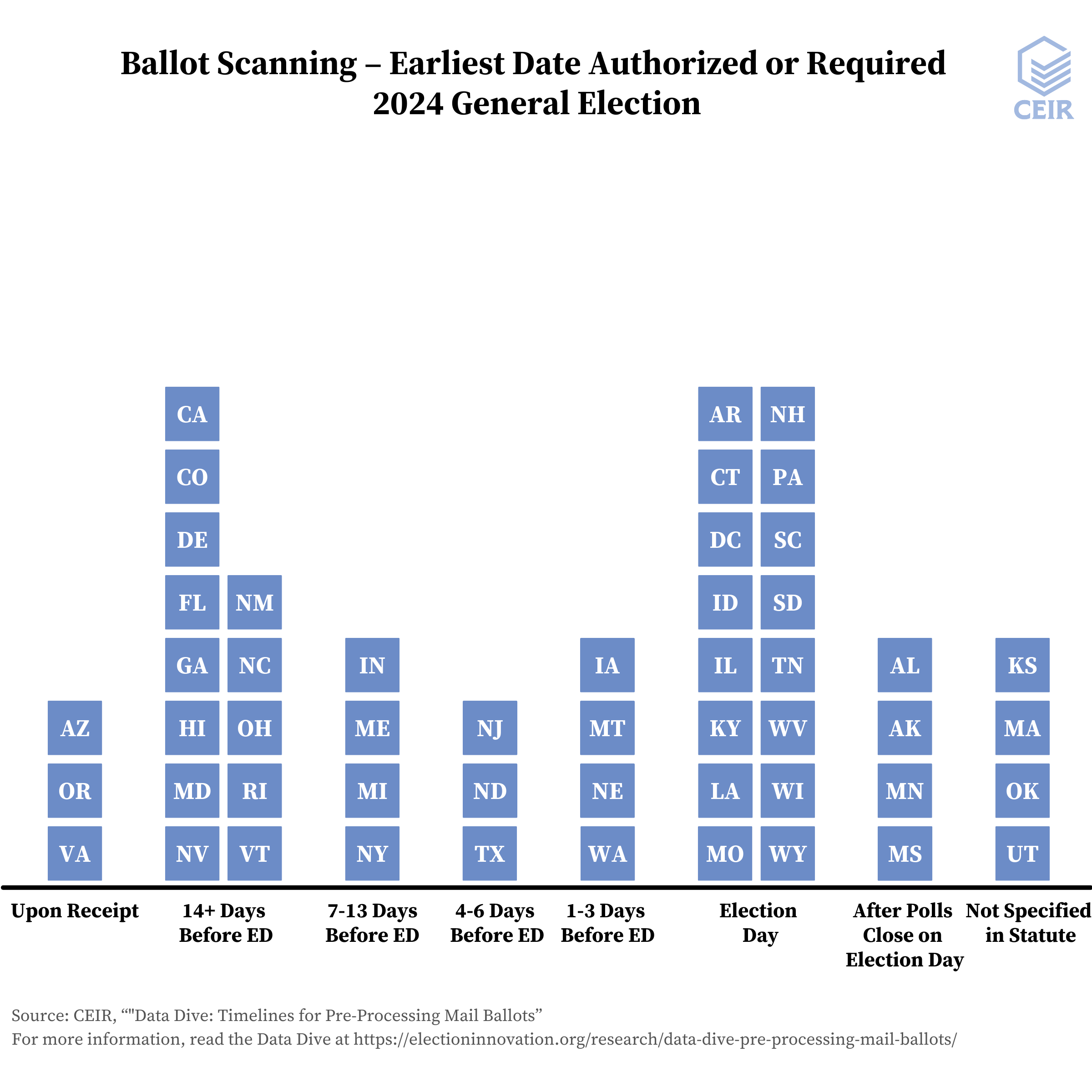
Earliest date election workers are allowed to scan mail ballots into vote counting machines.

The 2020 election in Pennsylvania illustrated the potential impact of the delay. Because of the COVID-19 pandemic, the state received 2.6 million mail-in ballots, a tenfold increase compared to past elections. None of these by law could be processed until 7 a.m. on Election Day. Three times as many Democrats as Republicans had made use of the mail-in option. This combined with the required delay in processing to produce a switch from a Republican lead to a Democratic lead several days after the election as mail-in ballots were completed—which in turn fueled conspiracy theories falsely claiming vote tampering by officials.

=== Post election day mail-in ballot counting ===
On June 29, 2026, the U.S. Supreme Court, in the 5-4 Watson v. Republican National Committee ruling, ruled against a Republican National Committee led effort to block counting of election day ballots in the time after election day is held in areas of the United States.

== History ==
Absentee voting in the United States first emerged in colonial America, when soldiers serving in the Continental Army and individuals who lived in homes that were "vulnerable to Indian attack" could utilize absentee voting. Absentee ballots were first used on a large scale for the military during the American Civil War. Early absentee voting laws restricted the practice to members of the armed services. The first allowance for civilian absentee voting was in Vermont in 1896. By 1938, 42 states allowed absentee voting for civilians. Nearly 2% of voters in the 1936 election voted through absentee ballots. Starting in the 1970s, more states began to offer no-excuse absentee voting, allowing voters the ability to vote absentee without needing an excuse.

The share of absentee voters has increased over time. Historically, one particularly prominent group who voted through absentee ballots were federal employees in Washington, D.C.

=== Expansion during the COVID-19 pandemic ===
In 2020, amid the COVID-19 pandemic, a significant increase in postal ballots was expected. The National Vote at Home Institute, which advocates for postal ballots and is led by former Denver elections director Amber McReynolds, analyzed all states and found that 32 states were lacking necessary policies or procedures, including 15 states which lack steps to verify voters' addresses, 17 which do not mandate a signature verification process, and 30 do not have adequate options to cure defects in voter signatures. In many systems voters had no way to remedy disqualifications due to signature mismatches.

While members of Congress pushed to expand absentee voting and the CDC and other public health experts advised postal voting as a form of voting which minimizes in-person contact, the efforts were opposed by President Donald Trump, who viewed a higher turnout as potentially harmful to Republicans, beginning to make unsubstantiated claims about widespread fraud.

=== Restrictions during Trump's presidencies ===
In July 2020, Trump suggested postponing the 2020 presidential election based on unsubstantiated claims about extensive postal voting fraud. The new, Trump-appointed administration of the United States Postal Service made changes which resulted in slower delivery of mail. Donald Trump openly stated that he opposes funding USPS because of mail-in voting. In September 2020, a federal judge issued an injunction against the recent USPS actions, ruling that Trump and DeJoy were "involved in a politically motivated attack on the efficiency of the Postal Service", adding that the 14 states requesting the injunction "demonstrated that this attack on the Postal Service is likely to irreparably harm the states' ability to administer the 2020 general election".

The USPS warned that it could not guarantee that all ballots cast by mail in the 2020 election would arrive in time to be counted. For this reason, election experts advocated that postal ballots be mailed weeks in advance of election day. A March 2021 report from the Postal Service's inspector general found that the vast majority of mail-in ballots and registration materials in the 2020 election were delivered to the relevant authorities on time. The Postal Service handled approximately 135 million pieces of election-related mail between September 1 and November 3, delivering 97.9% of ballots from voters to election officials within three days, and 99.89% of ballots within seven days.

In several court cases in 2020, Republicans in national and state legislatures have pushed to restrict access or place more stringent limitations upon postal voting while Democrats have pushed to expand it or lift restrictions.

In 2025, President Trump issued Executive Order 14248 titled "Preserving and Protecting the Integrity of American Elections", instructing the U.S. Post Office to implement significant restrictions on mail-in voting. Specifically, the executive order called for election officials to submit an allowlist of registered voters, and anyone attempting to vote via mail that is not on the list would have their ballot rejected. This would be enforced by the U.S. Postal Service, not state election authorities. Additionally, all mail-in ballots would need to be redesigned to follow a standardized design. Attempts to implement this system for the 2026 midterm elections were blocked twice in court, with litigation still pending as of September 2026.

== Turnout ==
Insofar as postal voting makes the act of voting easier, it may facilitate a campaign's get out the vote efforts. Campaigns can also target potential voters more efficiently by skipping those whose ballots have already been processed by the elections office. Conversely, face-to-face canvassing has been found to be less effective with postal voting.

In 2016, the US Government Accountability Office (GAO) issued a report outlining turnout improvements seen in vote by mail elections.

Researchers in 2020 have found that in elections with all-mail voting, overall turnout increases. This increase is particularly pronounced among groups that typically have low turnout rates, such as young people and people of color. For instance, in Colorado they found overall turnout rose 9 percentage points, while it rose 16 percentage points among young people, 13 among African-Americans, 11 among Asian-Americans, 10 among Latinos, blue-collar workers, those without a high school diploma, and those with less than $10,000 of wealth.

== Reliability of postal ballots ==
=== Rejection statistics ===
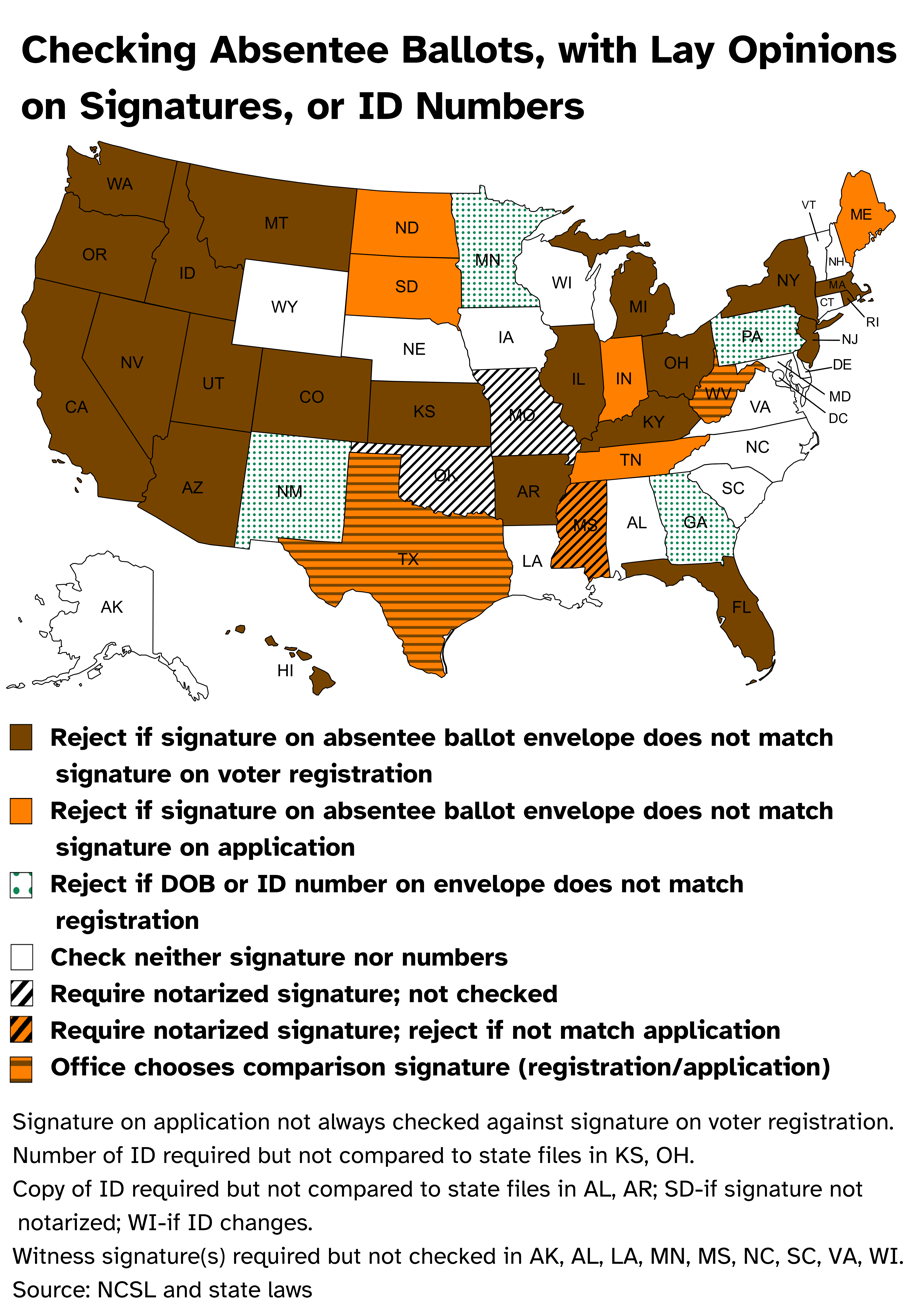
Checking absentee ballots

As of 2020, about 1% of postal ballots were rejected (compared to .01% in-person where election workers can help verify and assist the voter). For the states that reported a reason in 2016, common reasons were:

- Non-matching signature (.28%)
- Ballot missed deadline (.23%)
- No signature (.20%)
- No witness signature (.03%)
- Voter deceased (.015%)
- Voted in person (.013%)
- First-time voter without proper identification (.011%)

=== Estimates of rejection frequency ===
Richard Hasen, a professor at University of California, Irvine School of Law said, "problems are extremely rare in the five states that rely primarily on vote-by-mail." Postal ballots have been the source of "most significant vote-counting disputes in recent decades" according to Edward Foley, director of the Election Law program at Ohio State University.

=== Incidence of fraud ===
Among the billions of votes from 2000 to 2012, there were 491 known cases of absentee ballot fraud. Justin Levitt, a law professor at Loyola Marymount University does not have statistics on postal ballot fraud, but said "I do collect anecdotal reports ... misconduct in the mail voting process is meaningfully more prevalent than misconduct in the process of voting in person ... Misconduct still amounts to only a tiny fraction of the ballots cast by mail." Lonna Atkeson, an expert in election administration, said about mail-in voting fraud, "It's really hard to find ... The fact is, we really don't know how much fraud there is ... There aren't millions of fraudulent votes, but there are some."

President Donald Trump claimed that expansion of absentee voting would lead to "levels of voting that, if you ever agreed to it, you'd never have a Republican elected in this country again". In May 2020, he began to claim that postal voting was highly vulnerable to fraud. Fact checkers said that there is no evidence of substantial fraud associated with mail voting.

=== Signature verification process ===
Sorting vote by mail envelopes, San Jose, Santa Clara County, California, 2018

Most states check signatures to attempt to prevent forged paper ballots. Signature mismatches were the most common reason for rejecting postal ballots in 2016 and the second most common, after late arrival, in 2018. While many states accept in-person votes without needing identification, most require some verification on postal ballots. As of 2024, 31 states conduct signature verification on returned absentee or mail-in ballots. Nine states do not conduct signature verification, but require the signature of either a witness, two witnesses, or a notary. Ten states and Washington, D.C. neither conduct signature verification nor require a witness signature.

The first step after receiving mailed ballots is to compare the voter's signature on the outside of the envelope with one or more signatures on file in the election office. Smaller jurisdictions have temporary staff compare signatures. Larger jurisdictions use computers to scan envelopes, quickly decide if the signature matches well enough, and set aside non-matches in a separate bin. Temporary staff then double-check the rejections, and in some places check the accepted envelopes too.

Error rates of computerized signature reviews are not published. The best academic researchers have 10-14% error rates. Algorithms:

look for a certain number of points of similarity between the compared signatures ... a wide range of algorithms and standards, each particular to that machine's manufacturer, are used to verify signatures. In addition, counties have discretion in managing the settings and implementing manufacturers' guidelines ... there are no statewide standards for automatic signature verification ... most counties do not have a publicly available, written explanation of the signature verification criteria and processes they use.

Handwriting experts say "it is extremely difficult for anyone to be able to figure out if a signature or other very limited writing sample has been forged," In manual signature reviews, "election officials with little or no training in verifying a person's signature are tasked with doing just that ... it's unlikely that only one or two samples will show the spectrum of a person's normal variations ..." Colorado's guide for manual verification is recommended by the federal government. Colorado accepts any signature that matches with respect to cursive v. printed, flowing v. slow and deliberate, overall spacing, size, proportions, slanted v. straight, spelling and punctuation. When signatures do not match on these items, staff still accept them if staff can think of a reasonable explanation for differences. In a California study, most counties, when they manually reviewed ballot signatures, had "a basic presumption in favor of counting each ballot." California extended this standard in 2020 regulations, "begin with the basic presumption that the signature on the petition or ballot envelope is the voter's signature ... only be rejected if two different elections officials unanimously find beyond a reasonable doubt that the signature differs in multiple, significant, and obvious respects from all signatures in the voter's registration record." Texas officials must use their "best judgment" without training. Published examples show very different signatures coming from the same person.

In 16 states, when election offices reject signatures, they notify the voters so they can mail another signature, which may be just as hard to check, or they can come to the office and vouch for the envelope, usually in less than a week; the other 36 states have no process to cure discrepancies. Notification by US mail results in more cures than email or telephone notice. In the Florida 2020 general election, 73% of the 47,000 initially rejected ballots were cured, and in the 2022 Vermont primary, 61% of 809 were cured.

Rejected envelopes, with ballots still unseen in them, are stored in case of future challenges. Accepted envelopes are opened and separated from the envelopes in a way that no one sees the external name and the ballot choices. The Election Assistance Commission says machines can help, but this step requires the most space of any step, especially when workers have to be 6 feet apart.

=== Unequal signature rejection rates ===
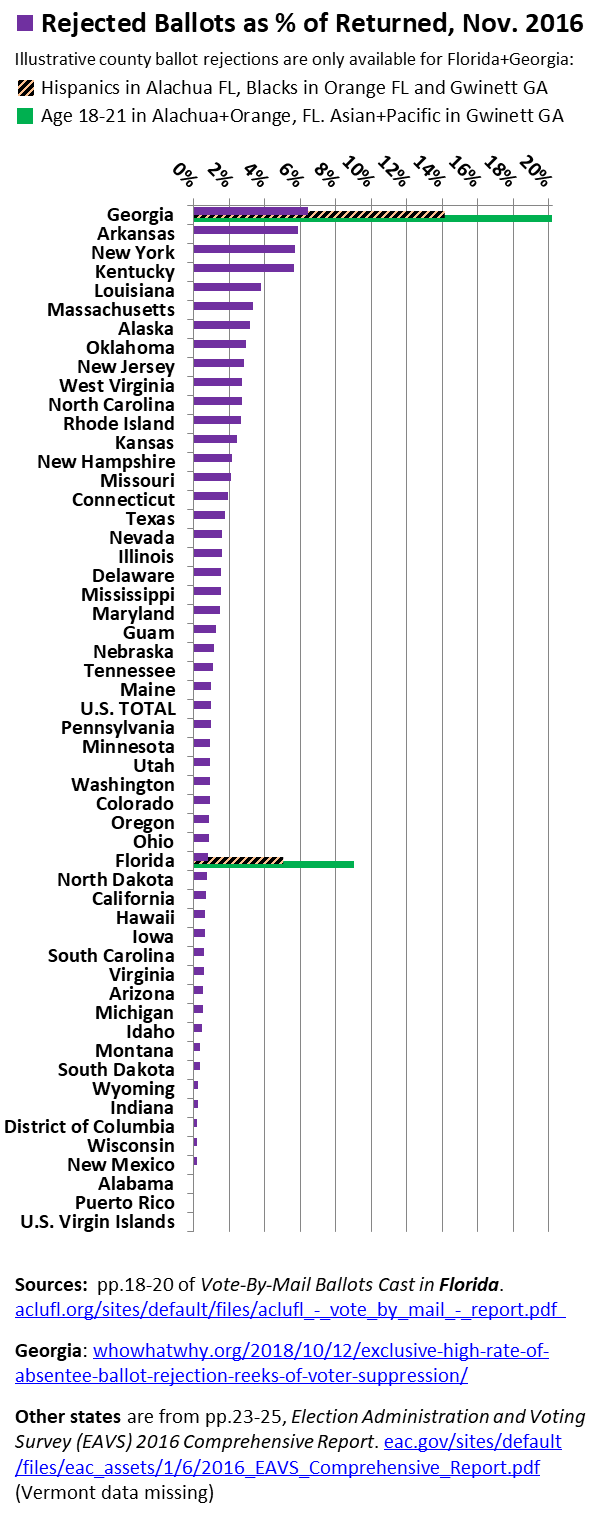
Postal ballots, rejection rates by state, US, November 2016, except Georgia 2018

The highest error rates in signature verification are found with lay people, higher than for computers, which in turn make more errors than experts. Researchers have published error rates for computerized signature verification. They compare different systems on a common database of true and false signatures. The best system falsely rejects 10% of true signatures, while it accepts 10% of forgeries. Another system has error rates on both of 14%, and the third-best has error rates of 17%. It is possible to be less stringent and reject fewer true signatures, at the cost of also rejecting fewer forgeries, which means erroneously accepting more forgeries. Vendors of automated signature verification claim accuracy, and do not publish their error rates.

Voters with short names are at a disadvantage, since even experts make more mistakes on signatures with fewer "turning points and intersections."

The National Vote at Home Institute reports that 17 states do not mandate a signature verification process.

In the November 2016 general election, rejections ranged from none in Alabama and Puerto Rico, to 6% of ballots returned in Arkansas, Georgia, Kentucky and New York. In 2020 special elections in New Jersey, 10% of postal ballots were rejected, much higher than the 3% rejections in the 2018 general election in New Jersey. The rise was largely attributed to inexperience of many voters using postal ballots for the first time, though some elections have resulted in charges regarding voter fraud. One such race was the Paterson municipal election, where 19% of ballots cast were disqualified. Approximately 800 of the more than 3190 votes disqualified were related to the various voter fraud allegations. Where reasons for rejection were known, in 2018, 114,000 ballots arrived late, 67,000 failed signature verification, 55,000 lacked voter signatures, and 11,000 lacked witness signatures in states that require them.

Rejection rates are higher for ballots that claim to come from young or minority voters. In the 2020 primary and 2016 general elections, Florida officials rejected 4% of postal ballots that claimed to come from voters aged 18–25. In the 2018 general election they rejected 5%. In Florida over age 60 or 65, rejections were only one percent in 2020, two thirds of a percent in 2018 and half a percent in 2016. However over age 90, rejection rates were above average, though not as high as under age 25. Rejections were 2% for ballots claiming to come from Florida non-white voters, and 1% from white voters in all three years. In the 2018 Florida election, 4% of postal ballots from military voters stationed inside the United States were rejected. Florida voters are not allowed to cure signature problems if these are discovered after election day.

Florida rejection rates in 2016 varied by county, ranging from none to 4%, and up to 5% for ballots that claimed to come from blacks or Hispanics in some counties. Two counties with large universities rejected 9% of 18-21-year-olds: Alachua and Orange, while Pinellas, which also has large universities, rejected 0.2% of this age range.

In Georgia's 2018 general election, most counties rejected higher fractions of ballots claiming to come from black or Hispanic voters than from white voters. The highest rejection rates for ballots that claimed to come from black voters were in Polk 17%, Taylor and Clay 16%, Putnam, and Warren 14%, Atkinson and Candler 13%, McIntosh 12%, and Glynn 10%. For Hispanics, Thomas and Putnam counties rejected 20%, Bulloch 14%, Barlow 12%, Glynn 11%, Decatur 10%. The highest rates for whites were Pickens 13%, Coffee and Polk 10%. Researchers also found higher rejection rates for women, which they hypothesized could relate to name changes not updated at the voter registration office, though issues with hyphenated last names can also cause signature rejections. Bias in computer verification depends on the set of signatures used for training the computer, and bias in manual review depends on whether the temporary staff recognize names as non-white.

Many voter registrations, especially for younger voters, come from driver's license applications, where the signature is done on an electronic signature pad. People move their hands differently when signing on paper and on electronic pads. Further the pads used have low resolution, so distinctive elements of paper signatures on the ballot envelopes, are blurred or omitted in the electronic signatures used for comparison. Signatures also have more variation, and therefore are harder to verify, when they come from people who rarely use Roman characters, such as some Asian-Americans. Election officials find that a decline in cursive writing leads to young voters more often printing their names in signature blocks; a California official said she "cannot compare a printed name to a signature."

This can be a difficult process for the actual workers that reject signatures. Attorney Raul Macias has said, "Staff are under-trained, they're under-resourced, and they'll be under tremendous pressure to get results quickly and they're moving through thousands or millions of signatures." While 22 states allow the "curing" of a ballot signature, 28 do not.

=== Recommendations for signature verification ===
The Election Assistance Commission says computers should be set to accept only nearly perfect signature matches, and humans should doublecheck a sample, but they do not discuss acceptable error rates or sample sizes.

The Election Assistance Commission says the first human check of a signature rejected by machines will average 30 seconds, and a sample of decisions to accept should be checked. They recommend all rejections should be checked by bipartisan teams (6 feet apart) who will average 3 minutes for the final decision to reject, which means 6 minutes of staff time, plus supervision time. The commission also discusses the challenges of moving large numbers of envelopes without mixups from receipt, to machines, and various steps of verification, rejection, and voter notification to cure mismatches, as well as counting and logging the number of ballots at every step. They mention the extra security needed when voters send copies of identity documents to cure their signature rejection.

The Election Assistance Commission notes that signatures over ten years old are another problem and recommends Hawaii's practice of inviting every voter to send a new signature. California researchers recommended that the public needs easy access to see the signature on file before mailing in ballots, to further maximize matches.

The National Vote at Home Institute recommends state-wide or regional centers for signature verification to increase transparency. and reduce the insider risks of temporary local staff, though the Election Assistance Commission notes that shared equipment may not be consistent with local chain of custody requirements, and that public bidding may take months.

=== Security printing ===
Some states say they print postal ballots on special paper to prevent forgeries. California assigns a tinted watermark to the ballots for each election, which is created by printing an image with a screen rather than density variations. Special papers, microprinting, magnetic ink and other measures are common to protect currency, bank checks and stamps. Election officials do not say that envelopes have these features, nor that they review ballots based on these methods, though the Labor Department reviews paper when considering if union election ballots are forged.

The largest US vendor of election scanners required use of its own paper as of 2015, and "highly recommended" it as of 2019. The paper has specified weight, thickness, reflectivity for compatibility with scanners, but the scanner does not measure these to detect forgeries. The company says colored paper may not be used. Colors may be printed in areas away from the voting marks, but they are scanned as either black or white, no gray.

States print bar codes on return envelopes to identify the voter (coding a serial number for each envelope mailed), so a forger would need to access the coding system in order to forge bar codes. California lets voters write votes "in a letter or note" on any paper, and enclose as many such notes in a vote by mail envelope as will fit, with a signature for each on the outside. Only one bar code on the envelope is needed.

Ballot printing is centralized. For example, California has nine authorized ballot printers. Maryland uses one ballot printer state-wide. One company, Runbeck, printed 36 million ballots for 214 counties in 11 states for the November 2020 election, of which about half were postal ballots. Runbeck did not use watermarks or tracking marks in the paper, at least in Maricopa County which has over 60% of Arizona's voters. A California company prints 35 million ballots for 46 counties. Another company serves many counties in Ohio and Pennsylvania.

== Other challenges ==
Postal voting depends on the viability of the postal service. As of early 2020, the U.S. Postal Service has "a negative net worth of $65 billion and an additional $140 billion in unfunded liabilities." This financial crisis has become more pressing amidst the coronavirus pandemic, as the $2 trillion economic stimulus package did not include money for the postal service.

In the case of all-postal voting, or a high proportion of postal votes, there cannot be traditional "Election Night" news coverage in which the results are delivered within hours after polls close, as it takes several days to deliver and count ballots. As a result, it may require several days beyond the mail-in deadline before results can be publicized.

=== Blue shift ===
Blue shift is an observed phenomenon under which in-person votes overstate the true final percent of votes for the Republican Party (whose color is red), while provisional (and mail-in) votes, which are counted later, overstate the true final percent of votes for the Democratic Party (whose color is blue). This means election day results can initially show a large Republican lead, or "red mirage", but mail-in ballots later demonstrate a Democratic victory. This can also happen in the opposite direction, when there is a "blue mirage", or early lead by Democrats, followed by a red shift back to Republicans. This can lead observers to call into question the election legitimacy, when in fact, the election results are legitimate. Blue shift occurs because young voters, low-income voters, and voters who move often, are likely to vote by mail and are likely to lean Democratic.

The phenomenon was first identified by Edward Foley of Ohio State University in 2013. He found that Democratic candidates are significantly more likely to gain votes during the canvass period, which are the votes counted after election night. This asymmetry did not always exist, as in the 20th century, as recently as the 1996 United States presidential election, Republicans and Democrats were both able to cut their opponents' lead during the canvass period. Foley conjectured that the 2002 passage of the Help America Vote Act accelerated the pronounced asymmetry of the blue shift phenomenon, because it required states to allow provisional ballots to be cast. He later found that the variation in the size of the blue shift is positively associated with the number of provisional ballots and the Democratic partisanship of the state in question. The growth in the persistent blue-shifted overtime vote began with the 2004 United States presidential election.

== Alternatives ==
An increasing number of states in the US now allow drive-thru voting. In the process voters leave their absentee ballots in a drop box at designated locations. Some locations allow drop-off voting 24/7.

Many states provide voters with multiple ways to return their ballot: by mail, via in person secure drop boxes, and at voting centers where they can get questions answered, replacement ballots, etc. Oregon now has 300 drop boxes across the state in the weeks leading up to each election, and more voters now cast their ballot in person than by return mail. The term "vote at home" is starting to replace "vote by mail" for that reason. California's roll-out of vote-by-mail is incorporating voting centers as a key part of their effort. Anchorage's successful pilot included many drop boxes and some voting centers.

== Voting from abroad (UOCAVA) ==
In 2018, 350,000 ballots came through procedures of the Uniformed and Overseas Citizens Absentee Voting Act (UOCAVA), from military and merchant marine voters stationed inside or outside the United States, and other citizens living outside the United States. In 1986 Congress enacted UOCAVA, which requires that the states and territories allow United States citizens residing outside the United States, as well as members of the United States Uniformed Services and merchant marine, and their family members, inside or outside the United States, to register at their last residence in the US, and vote absentee in elections for federal offices. Most states and territories also let these citizens vote in state and local elections, and most states let citizens who have never lived in the US vote at their parents' last address.

Though many states had pre-existing statutes in place, UOCAVA made it mandatory and nationally uniform. Voters eligible for UOCAVA who do not receive an absentee ballot from their state in time to vote, may use the Federal Write-in Absentee Ballot. The voter's signature goes on an information sheet enclosed with this ballot, not on the envelope. It requires following state requirements for witnesses, but not for notaries. Almost half the states require ballots to be returned by mail. Other states allow mail along with some combination of fax, or email; four states allow a web portal. West Virginia experimented with use of smart phones, but this is no longer available.

== In states ==
The National Conference of State Legislatures has many tables showing rules about postal voting in every state.

=== Texas (voting from orbit) ===
In 1996, astronaut John Blaha was not able to vote in the November 1996 election, because his mission on Mir began before ballots were finalized, and lasted beyond Election Day. As a result, in 1997, Texas amended its election statutes to permit voting from outer space. The process extends traditional postal voting: the ballot is postal-mailed to a designated mailbox maintained by NASA, which sends it by encrypted electronic mail to the astronaut. After the astronaut completes the ballot, it is sent to the applicable Texas county clerk, who transcribes it to a paper ballot. The clerk is the only individual other than the voter who knows the contents of the submitted ballot. The first person to vote from space was astronaut David Wolf, who in 1997 voted in a local Texas election under the new law.

=== All vote-by-mail ===
As of 2022, California, Colorado, Hawaii, Nevada, Oregon, Utah, Vermont, and Washington allow all elections to be conducted by mail. In many other states there are counties or certain small elections where everyone votes by mail. California mailed every voter a ballot before the November 2020 election; California voters still kept the option to vote in-person.

==== California ====
In 2016, California passed SB 450, which authorizes a roll-out of voting by mail across the state, at county discretion. The state publishes postal voting rates, which have risen from 3% in 1962, to 81-91% in the 2020s. For the 2018 elections, 14 counties were authorized to vote by mail and five ultimately did so: Madera, Napa, Nevada, Sacramento, and San Mateo. In each of those five counties, voter turnout was higher than the average turnout for the state. For 2020, all counties were authorized to do so, and as of April 8, 2020 ten additional counties opted in: Amador, Butte, Calaveras, El Dorado, Fresno, Los Angeles, Mariposa, Orange, Santa Clara, and Tuolumne.

As of 2022, California mails every registered voter a ballot before the elections, but there is still the option to vote in-person.

==== Colorado ====
In 2013, Colorado began holding all elections by mail. A Pantheon Analytics study of the 2014 election showed a significant uptick in voter participation from what would have normally been "low propensity" voters. A PEW Charitable Trust study of the same election showed significant cost savings.

==== Hawaii ====
Hawaii instituted All-Vote-by-Mail for all elections beginning with its primary in May 2020.

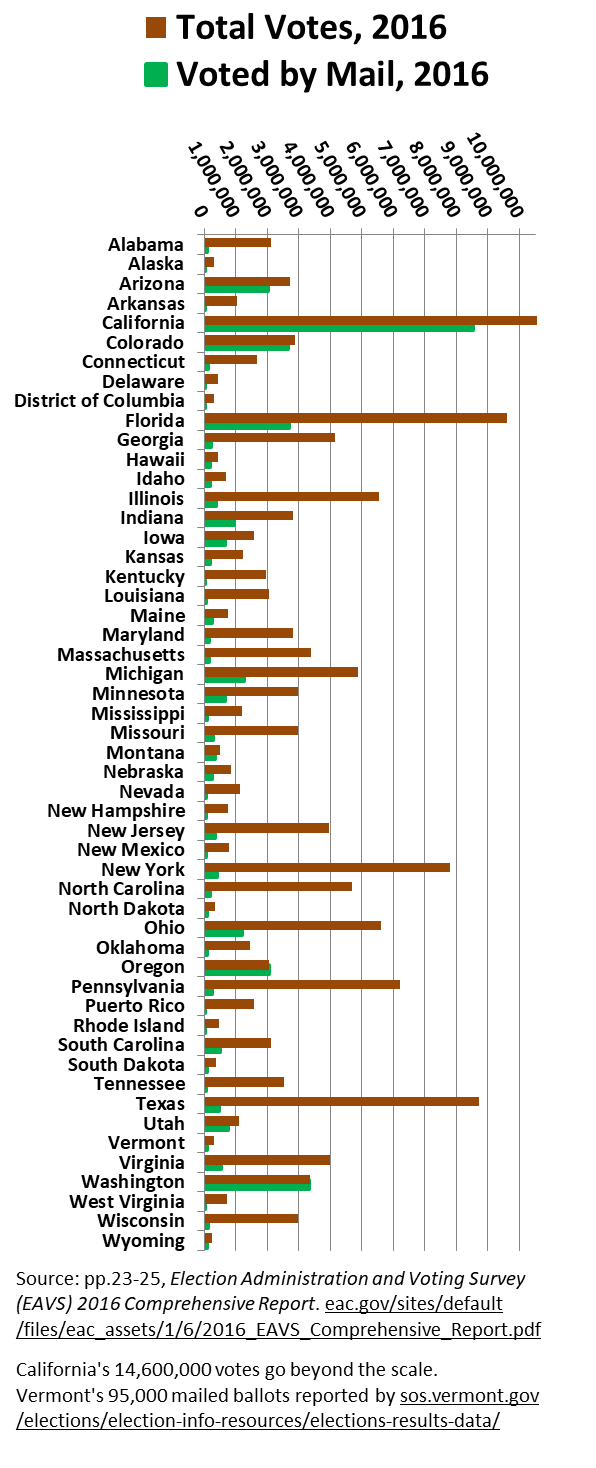
Total votes and mailed votes, by state US 2016

==== Kansas ====
Kansas conducted its Democratic primary in May 2020 entirely by mail.

==== Nevada ====
Nevada Governor Steve Sisolak (D) signed legislation authorizing mail-in-voting for every registered voter in the state on August 3, 2020. (Donald Trump threatened to sue, although Trump endorsed mail-in-voting in Republican-controlled Florida.) That law was only temporary, applying only to the 2020 election. On June 2, 2021, Governor Sisolak signed a law making all vote-by-mail permanent, although voters can opt out of getting ballots by mail.

==== New Jersey ====
New Jersey conducted a primarily vote by mail election for the primary in July 2020 albeit with a limited number of polling stations open for those who would vote provisionally as well as voters with disabilities.

==== Oregon ====
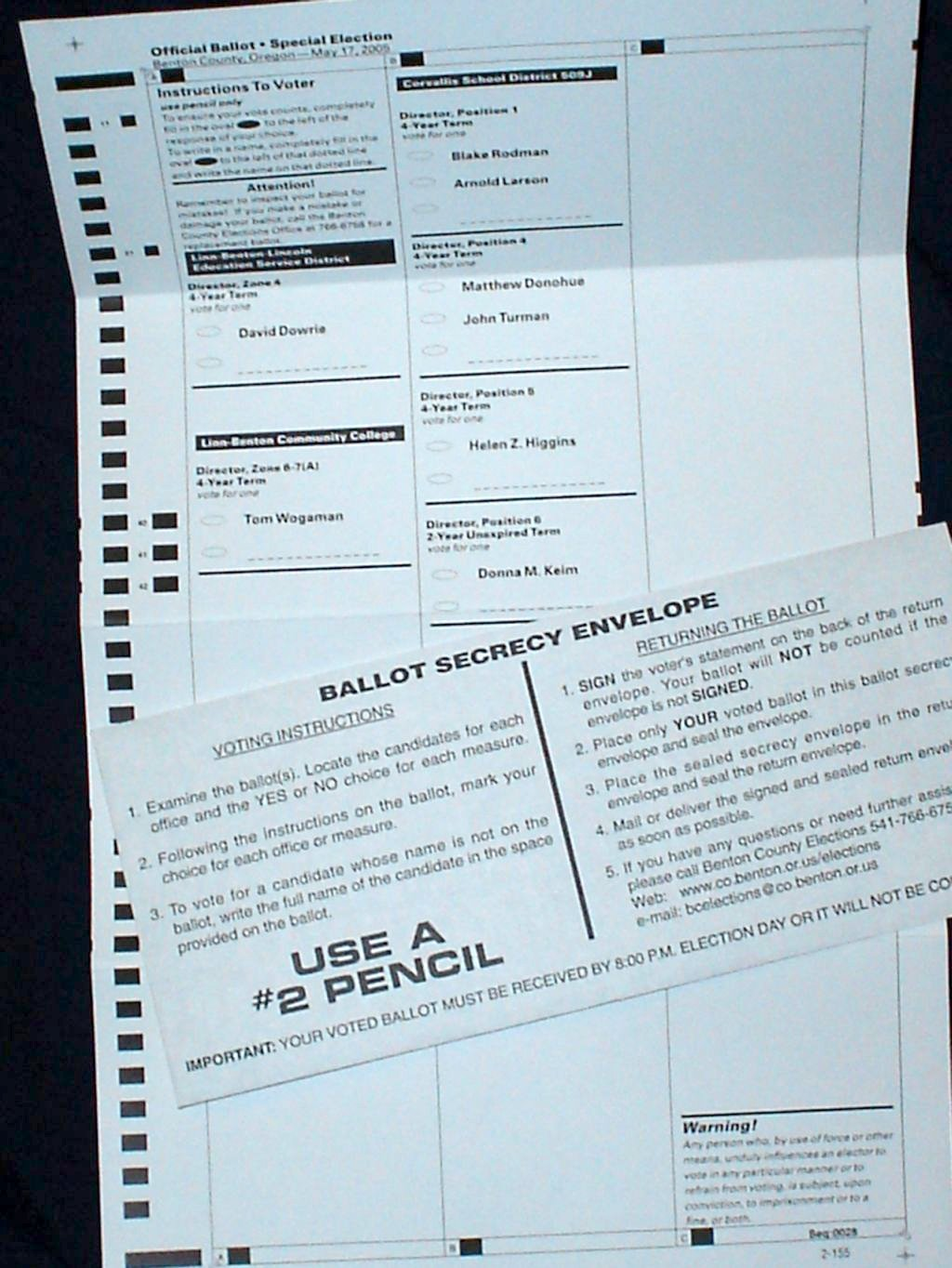
An Oregon mail-in ballot for a special election in May 2005

In 1998, voters in Oregon passed an initiative requiring that all elections be conducted by mail. Voters may also drop their ballots off at a county designated official drop site. Oregon has since reduced the cost of elections, and the time available to tally votes has increased. Initially, Oregon required receipt of votes by 8:00 pm local time on election day. But starting with the general election in 2020, ballots needed to be postmarked by Election Day. Also starting then, pre-paid postage envelopes were included with the ballots. Voter turnout in Oregon is among the highest in the United States.

==== Utah ====
In 2014, Utah started allowing each county to make their own decision regarding whether to go to all mailed-out ballots. In the 2016 general election, 21 of 29 counties did so. That rose to 27 of 29 counties in 2018, covering over 98% of their electorate, with all counties doing so in 2020. A Pantheon Analytics study of Utah's 2016 general election showed a 5–7% point higher turnout in the counties using vote by mail than those with traditional polling places, with even higher differences (~10% points) among younger voters.

==== Vermont ====
On May 18, 2021, the Vermont legislature passed a bill requiring general elections to be all vote-by-mail. Vermont Governor Phil Scott signed that bill on June 7, 2021, and asked the legislature to expand all vote-by-mail to primary elections too.

==== Washington ====
In 2011, the Washington legislature passed a law requiring all counties to conduct vote-by-mail elections. Local governments in Washington had the option to do so since 1987, and statewide elections had permitted it since 1993. By 2009, 38 of the state's 39 counties (all except Pierce County) had conducted all elections by mail. Pierce County joined the rest of the state in all-mail balloting by 2014. In Washington, ballots must be postmarked by election day, which helps to ensure all voters' votes are counted; ballot counting takes several days after election day to receive and process ballots. Beginning in 2018 postage is prepaid so voters do not have to use a stamp.

==== Local jurisdictions ====
Various local jurisdictions now have all vote-by-mail, or run pilot programs. 31 of 53 counties in North Dakota now vote by mail, as do over 1000 precincts in Minnesota (those with fewer than 400 registered voters). In 2018, pilot programs in Anchorage, Alaska exceeded previous turnout records and Garden County, Nebraska saw higher turnout versus the state average. Rockville, Maryland piloted vote-by-mail in 2019. In 2018, Connecticut's Governor issued Executive Order 64, directing a study of a possible move to vote by mail.

=== No-excuse postal voting ===
A study by the Center for Election Innovation & Research documented a steady increase in no-excuse postal voting (i.e., voters may vote by mail without an eligible reason) since the 2000 general election:

- In 2000, 21 states allowed no-excuse postal voting for the general election
- In 2004, 24 states
- In 2008, 28 states
- In 2012, 30 states and Washington, DC
- In 2016, 31 states and Washington, DC
- In 2020, 45 states and Washington, DC (sudden increase due in part to emergency measures during the COVID-19 pandemic)
- In 2024, 36 states and Washington, DC
- In 2026, 37 states and Washington, DC

As of 2026, Alaska, Arizona, California, Colorado, Florida, Georgia, Hawaii, Idaho, Illinois, Iowa, Kansas, Maine, Maryland, Massachusetts, Michigan, Minnesota, Montana, Nebraska, Nevada, New Jersey, New Mexico, New York, North Carolina, North Dakota, Ohio, Oklahoma, Oregon, Pennsylvania, Rhode Island, South Dakota, Utah, Vermont, Virginia, Washington, Washington DC, Wisconsin, and Wyoming have no-excuse postal voting.

As of June 2026, 14 states allow postal voting but require an eligible reason.

== Table: Permanent absentee voting lists ==
Info in table below is from the National Conference of State Legislatures: "Some states permit voters to join a permanent absentee/mail ballot voting list, also known as a 'single sign-on' list. Voters who request to be on this list automatically receive an absentee/mail ballot for each election. This option may be offered to all voters, or to a limited number of voters based on certain criteria. ... An additional six states [Michigan, Minnesota, Pennsylvania, Massachusetts, Missouri, and Alaska] not included on the table automatically send absentee/mail ballot applications to voters on a permanent list. This differs from the states in the table below since voters must return the application before receiving an absentee/mail ballot."

- Links below are "Elections in LOCATION" links.

States with permanent absentee voting lists, and people automatically receive ballots.
State	Any voter	Permanent disabilities	Senior voters (65 and older)
Alabama Ala. Code § 17-11-3.1		*	
Arizona Ariz. Rev. Stat. §16-544(A)	*		
Connecticut Conn. Gen. Stat. 9-140e		*	
Delaware Del. Code Ann. Tit. 15, §5503(k)		*	
Washington D.C. Mun. Regs. Tit. 3, § 720.4	*		
Kansas Kan. Stat. Ann. §25-1122(h)		*	
Louisiana Louisiana Secretary of State Disability Program		*	*
Maine 21-A ME Rev Stat § 753-A (effective Nov. 1, 2023)		*	*
Maryland Md. Code, Elec. Law § 9-311.1	*		
Mississippi Miss. Code Ann. § 23-15-629		*	
Montana Mont. Code Ann. §13-13-212(3)	*		
New Jersey N.J. Stat. §19:63-3(e)	*		
New York N.Y. Election Law §8-400		*	
Tennessee T. C. A. § 2-6-201		*	
Virginia VA Code 24.2-703.1	*		
West Virginia W. Va. Code §3-3-2b		*	
Wisconsin Wis. Stat. § 6.86(2)(a)		*	*

== See also ==
- Early voting
- Elections in the United States
- Voter suppression
