= Election Official Legal Defense Network =

Nonpartisan nonprofit project in election administration space

- Formation: September 2021
- Legal status: Nonprofit project
- Purpose: Pro bono legal defense of election officials
- Headquarters: Washington, D.C.
- Co-chairs: Robert Bauer, Benjamin Ginsberg
- Parent organization: Center for Election Innovation & Research
- Website: https://eoldn.org/

The Election Official Legal Defense Network (EOLDN) is a nonprofit project which provides legal advice and representation to election officials who experience threats, harassment, or exposure to criminal penalties with licensed. This service is available regardless of an election official's political affiliation or whether they work in red or blue states or counties.

EOLDN is a project of the nonpartisan nonprofit Center for Election Innovation & Research (CEIR).

== History and mission ==
Following the 2020 U.S. presidential election, Robert Bauer, a Democratic attorney who served as White House counsel under Barack Obama, and Benjamin Ginsberg, a longtime Republican election lawyer who represented President George W. Bush's campaign in the 2000 election, became increasingly concerned about growing threats and harassment aimed at election officials, as well as their exposure to new laws Bauer and Ginsberg characterized as "repressive."

Bauer and Ginsberg had collaborated in 2013 as co-chairs of the Presidential Commission on Election Administration, a yearlong investigation into voting irregularities, convened by President Obama. They reunited in June 2021 to co-author a New York Times op-ed calling attention to what they called "pernicious provisions" in recent state laws that threatened punishment of elections officials and workers "for just doing their jobs." The article also drew attention to the increasing problem of personal threats and harassment received by election officials.

Three months later, in response to these concerns, they partnered with CEIR Executive Director David J. Becker to create the Election Official Legal Defense Network as a project of the nonpartisan organization. As of June 2024, EOLDN included more than 6,000 pro bono attorneys.

In February 2025, in response to concerns expressed by election administrators of both parties over what it called an "expanded threat environment," EOLDN announced a broadening of its scope by preparing to assist election officials in the event of targeting by federal agencies, potentially including the Internal Revenue Service, the Department of Justice, the Federal Bureau of Investigation, or Congress.

EOLDN's current project lead is Angie Pitha.

== Cases ==
Although individual cases are confidential, some have been covered in the media with the officials' permission. Among them:

- Christine Gibbons, former registrar of Lynchburg, Virginia, who was not reappointed to her position in 2023 by the Lynchburg Election Board after what she described as a pattern of accusations and harassment following the 2022 election. This non-renewal was a departure from the tradition of reappointing registrars with positive performance reviews.
- Natalie Adona, clerk-recorder for Nevada County, California, who received persistent harassment regarding allegations of fraud in the 2020 election and her attempts to enforce a mask mandate during the COVID-19 pandemic.

== Awards ==
In July 2024, EOLDN's parent organization CEIR and EOLDN co-chairs Benjamin Ginsberg and Robert Bauer received the American Bar Association's "Unsung Heroes of Democracy" Award for their efforts in support of election officials.

== See also ==
- Pro bono
- Election official
