= Election official =

Person who runs an election

An election official or electoral administrator is an official responsible for the holding of elections. This can include officials responsible for all or part of the electoral process, such as voter registration, canvassing, the poll and voting, the count, or another element. Election officials are usually full or part time roles, depending on the jurisdiction, however there are also more temporary roles, such as those working at the poll or count.

Electoral administrators are typically appointed officials and must be impartial, although in some jurisdictions, such as the United States, they may be elected and a member of a political party, but must usually still act impartially.

== Australia ==
In federal elections, the Australian Electoral Commission has a divisional office for each of the electorates of the House of Representatives, the head of which serves as the divisional returning officer. The manager of a state office serves as the Australian electoral officer, which is the returning officer for Senate elections.

In state elections the returning officer will usually be a temporary post held by an individual who isn't permanently employed by the state's electoral commission.

== United Kingdom ==
With the exception of returning officers at parliamentary general elections, electoral administrators in the United Kingdom will typically be employed by the local authority's electoral services department. Some roles, such as campaign finance or party registration, are administered by the Electoral Commission.

=== Returning officer ===
In the United Kingdom the role of the returning officer (RO) differs by country, although they are typically main official responsible for the holding of an election. In England and Wales the returning officer for a parliamentary general election is an honorary role, while the acting returning officer performs of all or most of their duties. For other elections in England and Wales the returning officer is responsible for all aspects of the election. In Scotland the returning officer will usually be the chief executive of the local authority, and in Northern Ireland the returning officer is the chief electoral officer. Returning officers may also appoint a deputy acting returning officer or a deputy returning officer, the latter of which may appoint an assistant deputy returning officer (ADRO). The returning officer is responsible for declaring the result of an election.

=== Counting officer ===
For a referendum, such as under the Political Parties, Elections and Referendums Act 2000, there is a chief counting officer, who is the chairman of the Electoral Commission or someone appointed by them, and counting officers, who perform functions similar to a returning officer in an election.

=== Electoral registration officer ===
The electoral registration officer (ERO) is responsible for compiling the electoral roll. In England and Wales this is usually the head of the local authority's electoral services office, and may also be the returning officer or acting returning officer for an election. In Scotland the ERO is usually the assessor from the local valuation joint board. In Northern Ireland it is the chief electoral officer.

=== Presiding officer ===
The presiding officer is responsible for overseeing a polling station during an election. They are also usually responsible for the transport of ballot boxes to the polling station and count centre. The presiding officer oversees poll clerks.

=== Clerk of the crown in chancery ===
The clerk of the crown is responsible for issuing and receiving writs of election for elections to the House of Commons. Once all writs from a general election are received the clerk delivers a book of returns to the clerk of the House of Commons on the first day of the new parliament. A writ is usually issued pursuant to proclamation, however for a by-election the speaker of the House of Commons is responsible for authorising its issuance.

== United States ==
There are many different methods of choosing local election officials in the US, and the selection method can be different within a single state. In general, local election officials are either elected or appointed. In US states with Election Day voter registration, they also register unregistered voters on election day. In most other countries, however, voters do not need to register, all citizens being automatically included in the lists of eligible voters. Depending on the jurisdiction, election officials are chosen by a board of elections, county official (such as the county clerk or county auditor), city or township official (such as a city clerk), or a county party committee.

In California, poll workers can be any citizen who requests the job at least two months prior to an election. Inspectors and site supervisors receive a minimum of two training classes, and clerks are required to attend a training class within two weeks of the election, with additional certification classes for any machine or technological devices to be used. These classes cover a wide range of topics, including opening and closing of the polls, which color pen to use on which paper, dealing with irate voters, and the rare times when a voter can be challenged.

In Pennsylvania three poll workers in each election division are elected by their neighbors for a four year term. These poll workers are elected in the year following the US Presidential election (e.g., 2017, 2021, etc.)

In 41 of the 50 United States, high school students can serve as student election judges. Each state has its own set of requirements for students to serve as poll workers, but generally, students must be in good academic standing at their school and meet the particular age or grade conditions.

=== Threats to election officials since the 2020 election ===
The period during and after the 2020 United States presidential election saw an unprecedented rise in threats and harassment directed at election officialsfueled by disproven claims that election officials had been complicit in a conspiracy to steal the presidential election from Donald Trump.

Prominent examples:

- Georgia election workers Ruby Freeman and her daughter Wandrea' Moss were driven from their home by death threats after being falsely accused by Trump advisor Rudy Giuliani of manipulating vote tallies. Freeman and Moss subsequently won a defamation judgment against Giuliani.
- After Trump falsely claimed that then-Philadelphia City Commissioner Al Schmidt, a Republican, "refuse[d] to look at a mountain of corruption & dishonesty" in the city, Schmidt received graphic threats against his family.
- After a standoff with Arizona Senate Republicans over the handling of post-election voting materials, Republican Maricopa County Supervisor Bill Gates and his family were subject to explicit death threats, and Gates was hospitalized for treatment of PTSD.
- Following the phone call in which President Trump pressured Georgia Secretary of State Brad Raffensperger to "find 11,780 votes" and overturn the state's 2020 election results, Raffensperger and his family received death threats and "disgusting sexualized texts." The home of his daughter-in-law and two grandchildren was invaded by supporters of the president, and the home of Raffensperger's chief operating officer Gabriel Sterling was swatted.
- Threatening letters, some containing fentanyl, were mailed to elections offices in at least five states in November 2023, with some including messages such as "End elections now."

As much as two years after the 2020 election, some election officials have reported varying their routes to their homes and offices to avoid being followed, training in de-escalation techniques, and upgrading their home security systems. The profession as a whole has experienced an unparalleled exodus. A study by the Bipartisan Policy Center and UCLA found a four-year turnover rate of 39% for election officials in 2022.

In Fall 2021, Democratic election law attorney Robert Bauer (White House Counsel during the Obama Administration) and Republican election law attorney Benjamin Ginsberg (national counsel to the George W. Bush 2000 presidential campaign) launched the Election Official Legal Defense Network (EOLDN), a service connecting election administrators in need of legal advice or assistance with qualified, licensed pro bono attorneys. As of June 2024, EOLDN consisted of more than 6,000 attorneys in 47 states.

In February 2025, in response to concerns expressed by election administrators of both parties regarding an "expanded threat environment," EOLDN announced a broadening of its scope to include assisting election officials targeted by federal agencies including the Internal Revenue Service, the Department of Justice, the Federal Bureau of Investigation, or Congress.

=== Voting security ===
Election officials play a prominent role in voting security as well as cybersecurity. After the Russian government conducted foreign electoral interference in the 2016 United States elections, including both cyberattacks and disinformation campaigns, election officials worked alongside the newly created Cybersecurity and Infrastructure Security Agency of the Department of Homeland Security (DHS) to assess and strengthen the security of election infrastructure. This included upgraded voting equipment, improved post-election audits, hardening of voter registration database security, and enhanced cybersecurity, all implemented by election officials.

== See also ==
- Scrutineer
