= Benjamin Ginsberg (lawyer) =

American lawyer

- Born: Benjamin Langer Ginsberg; 1952 (age 73–74)
- Education: University of Pennsylvania (BA); Georgetown University (JD)
- Years active: 1981 – 2020
- Political party: Republican (before 2022); Independent
- Spouse: Jo Anne Talbot (m. 1979)
- Children: 2

Benjamin Langer Ginsberg (born c. 1952) is an American lawyer. He is best known for his work representing the Republican Party and its political campaigns, candidates, members of Congress and state legislatures and governors, as well as corporations, trade associations, businesses, and individuals participating in the political process.

He retired in 2020 as a partner at Jones Day. Prior, he had been a partner at Patton Boggs for over two decades.

== Early life, education and journalism work ==
Ginsberg was raised in a Jewish family and received his bachelor's degree from the University of Pennsylvania in 1974. While at Penn, he was involved in the school's newspaper, The Daily Pennsylvanian, where he served as a reporter (1970–72), contributing editor (1972) and editor-in-chief (1973).

After college he spent five years as a newspaper reporter for The Boston Globe, Philadelphia Bulletin, The Berkshire Eagle, and The Press-Enterprise.

Ginsberg received his Juris Doctor from the Georgetown University Law Center in 1982. While in law school, he worked in the Capitol Hill office of Representative George Brown Jr. (D-CA).

== Legal career ==
Ginsberg joined Patton Boggs in 1993 after serving for eight years as counsel to the Republican National Committee, the National Republican Senatorial Committee, and the National Republican Congressional Committee.

In the 2000 and 2004 election cycles, Ginsberg served as national counsel to the Bush-Cheney presidential campaign. In 2000, he played a central role in the Florida recount. He also represents the campaigns and leadership PACs of numerous members of the Senate and House, as well as the Republican National Committee, National Republican Senatorial Committee and National Republican Congressional Committee. He serves as counsel to the Republican Governors Association and has wide experience on the state legislative level from directing Republican redistricting efforts nationwide following the 1990 Census and being actively engaged in the 2001-2002 round of redistricting. In Jay Roach's Recount (about the 2000 election), Ginsberg is played by Bob Balaban.

In 2004, Ginsberg gave legal advice to the controversial 527 Group Swift Boat Veterans for Truth. Ginsberg resigned as legal counsel from the Bush campaign on August 25 that year after his position was made public.

Ginsberg appears frequently on television commenting on law and politics. He is an MSNBC political analyst. He also sits on the Advisory Committee of the Election Law Program at William & Mary Law School.

He is a former Resident Fellow at the Harvard Institute of Politics at Harvard Kennedy School.

In November 2011, Ginsberg was included on The New Republic's list of Washington's most powerful, least famous people.

Ginsberg served as National Counsel to Mitt Romney's Presidential campaign in 2008 and in 2012. In August 2012, Politico reported that "Ginsberg has handled the campaign's most sensitive legal matters... and would be the most obvious choice for White House counsel" in a potential Romney cabinet.

In 2013, Ginsberg was a signatory to an amicus curiae brief submitted to the Supreme Court in support of same-sex marriage during the Hollingsworth v. Perry case.

President Barack Obama chose Ginsberg and Robert Bauer, a Democrat, in 2013 to co-chair the Presidential Commission on Election Administration, a yearlong investigation into voting problems. Their findings, "The American Voting Experience: Report and Recommendations of the Presidential Commission on Election Administration," were published in 2014. Ginsberg also joined the law firm of Jones Day as a partner in 2014, one of a trio of Patton Boggs colleagues; retiring from the firm in August 2020.

In September 2020, The Washington Post published an op-ed by Ginsberg that criticized President Donald Trump for encouraging supporters to commit voter fraud and for making false statements claiming fraud was widespread when it is not. Ginsberg wrote, "The truth is that after decades of looking for illegal voting, there's no proof of widespread fraud. At most, there are isolated incidents — by both Democrats and Republicans. Elections are not rigged. Absentee ballots use the same process as mail-in ballots — different states use different labels for the same process."

In November 2020, Ginsberg wrote in another Washington Post op-ed:

I spent four decades in the Republican trenches, representing GOP presidential and congressional campaigns, working on Election Day operations, recounts, redistricting and other issues, including trying to lift the consent decree.... Nearly every Election Day since 1984 I've worked with Republican poll watchers, observers and lawyers to record and litigate any fraud or election irregularities discovered. The truth is that over all those years Republicans found only isolated incidents of fraud. Proof of systematic fraud has become the Loch Ness Monster of the Republican Party. People have spent a lot of time looking for it, but it doesn't exist.

He testified at the second public hearing of the January 6 House committee about Donald Trump's failed 2020 election lawsuits.

In September 2021, Ginsberg joined with Robert Bauer, his past co-chair of the Presidential Commission on Election Administration, to found the Election Official Legal Defense Network, a nonprofit project connecting election officials who experience threats, harassment, or exposure to criminal penalties with licensed, qualified pro bono attorneys.
