= Council Tax in Scotland =

Council Tax in Scotland is a tax on domestic property which was introduced across Scotland in 1993, along with England and Wales, following passage of the Local Government Finance Act 1992. It replaced the Community Charge (popularly known as the Poll Tax). Each property is assigned one of eight bands (A to H) based on property value, and the tax is set as a fixed amount for each band. Some properties are exempt from the tax, some people are exempt from the tax, while some get a discount.

== Organisation ==
Council Tax is collected by local authorities though part of the tax goes to Scottish Water for water and sewage services.

=== Liability for Council Tax ===
In general terms: The occupiers of a property are liable, regardless of tenure, or the owners if the property is unoccupied, except if the property is a 'house in multiple occupation', in which case the landlord is liable for paying the Council Tax.

== Calculation ==
Each dwelling is allocated to one of eight bands coded by letters A to H on the basis of its assumed capital value as of 1 April 1991 and newer properties than this are assigned a nominal 1991 value. Assessment of property values is performed by the Assessor appointed by each local authority; in some cases there is a valuation joint board that covers multiple council areas.

Each local authority sets a tax rate expressed as the annual levy on a Band D property inhabited by two liable adults. This decision automatically sets the amounts levied on all types of households and dwellings. The nominal Band D property total is calculated by adding together the number of properties in each band and multiplying by the band ratio. So 100 Band D properties will count as 100 nominal Band D properties, whereas 100 Band C properties will count as 89 nominal Band D properties. Each collecting authority then adds together the Band D amounts for their area (or subdivisions of their area in the case, for example, of civil parish council precepts) to reach a total Band D council tax bill. To calculate the council tax for a particular property a ratio is then applied. A Band D property will pay the full amount, whereas a Band H property will pay 245% of that figure.

=== Current bands ===
Council Tax bands as of April 2017, and ratios levied, are:

Band	Value (relative to 1991 prices)	proportion of band D	Ratio as %
A	up to £27,000	240/360	67%
B	£27,001 to £35,000	280/360	78%
C	£35,001 to £45,000	320/360	89%
D	£45,001 to £58,000	360/360	100%
E	£58,001 to £80,000	473/360	131%
F	£80,001 to £106,000	585/360	163%
G	£106,001 to £212,000	705/360	196%
H	£212,001 and above	882/360	245%

== Criticism ==
=== Collection of unpaid tax ===
Criticism has been levied not so much at the principle of the tax but at its debt collection arrangements: Community Charge and Council Tax debts can be pursued up to 40 years later (Note: Councils can issue a warrant up to 20 years after the tax was due, but have a further 20 years to collect the tax after the warrant is issued. Any part of the 20 years in which to issue the warrant that is remaining is not added to the 20 years in which the tax can be recovered.) – few people will have conserved their payment receipts for such a long time and as such are unable to prove that they paid. Under Scottish Law, it is the responsibility of the tax payer to prove that the tax has been paid, not for the council to prove that it has not. John Wilson MSP presented an Enforcement of Local Tax Arrears (Scotland) Bill on 19 March 2010 in order to try to reduce this collection time from 20 to 5 years. Although Wilson's bill has not made any progress (as of October 2016), the Scottish parliament has passed the Community Charge Debt (Scotland) Bill to stop Councils pursuing debts from the older Community Charge, though there are some scrutiny stages to go through before it can become law.

== See also ==
- Local income tax
- Window tax
