= Robert Bauer =

American lawyer and White House Counsel (born 1952)

Bob Bauer
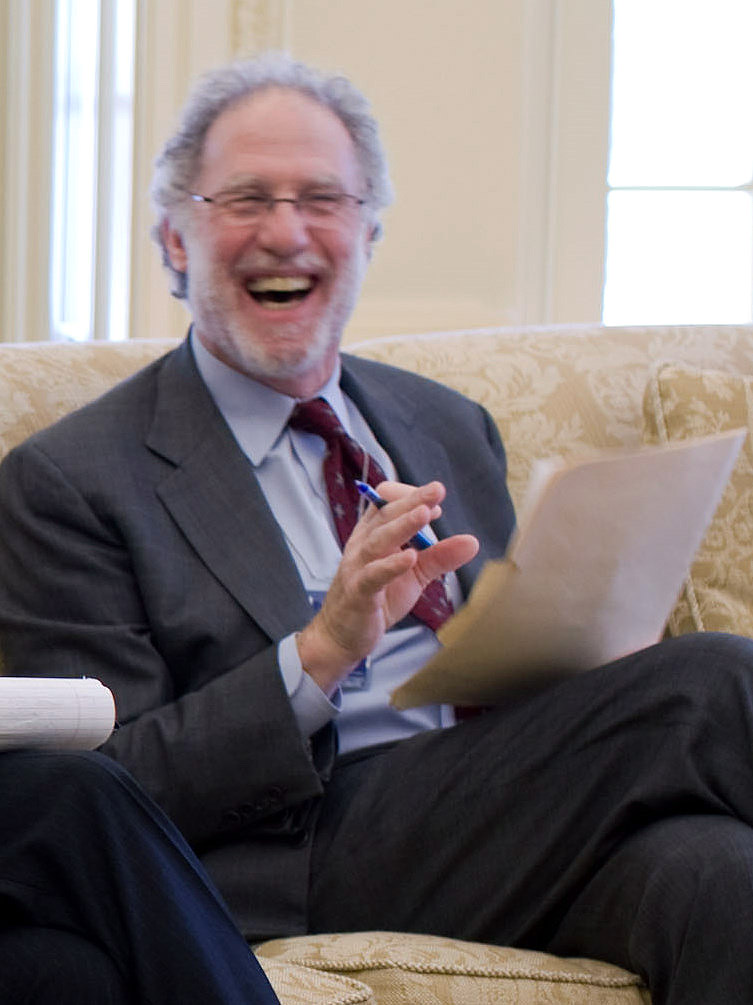

Co-Chair of the Presidential Commission on the Supreme Court of the United States
- In office April 9, 2021 – December 7, 2021 Serving with Cristina M. Rodríguez
- President: Joe Biden
- Preceded by: Position established
- Succeeded by: Position abolished

White House Counsel
- In office January 3, 2010 – June 30, 2011
- President: Barack Obama
- Preceded by: Greg Craig
- Succeeded by: Kathryn Ruemmler

Personal details
- Born: February 22, 1952 (age 74) New York City, New York, U.S.
- Party: Democratic
- Spouse: Anita Dunn
- Education: Harvard University (BA); University of Virginia (JD)

Robert F. Bauer (born February 22, 1952) is an American attorney who served as White House counsel under President Barack Obama.

== Early life and education ==
Born in New York City into a Jewish family, Bauer graduated from Phillips Exeter Academy in 1970. He earned a Bachelor of Arts degree from Harvard College in 1973, and his Juris Doctor from the University of Virginia School of Law in 1976.

== Career ==
Bauer was President Obama's personal attorney and the general counsel of the Barack Obama 2008 presidential campaign. He has also previously served as the general counsel to the Democratic National Committee, and had advised President Obama since 2005.

As general counsel for the 2008 campaign, Bauer asked the Justice Department to investigate the officers and donors of American Issues Project after it ran a negative ad about Obama.

In November 2009, he was named to be the next White House counsel, upon the resignation of Gregory Craig.

On June 2, 2011, the White House Press Office stated that Bauer would be returning to private practice at Perkins Coie, and that principal deputy counsel to the President Kathryn Ruemmler (his deputy, in that office since January 2010 and before that since January 2009 as principal associate deputy U.S. attorney general) would succeed him. The position, because it is part of the Executive Office staff that personally advises the president and is not an agency or Cabinet department or military head, does not require Senate confirmation despite the prominence of the office.

Bauer returned to private practice to again represent the president's election team and the Democratic National Committee. "Bob was a critical member of the White House team," Mr. Obama said. "He has exceptional judgment, wisdom, and intellect, and he will continue to be one of my close advisers."

Obama chose Bauer and Benjamin L. Ginsberg, a Republican, in 2013 to co-chair the Presidential Commission on Election Administration, a yearlong investigation into voting problems. Their findings, "The American Voting Experience: Report and Recommendations of the Presidential Commission on Election Administration," were published in 2014.

Bauer serves as Professor of the Practice and Distinguished Scholar in Residence at New York University School of Law. He teaches classes including "The Role of the Lawyer in Public Life" and "Political Reform".

Bauer assisted with vetting efforts for the selection of Joe Biden's running mate in the 2020 presidential election.

During the Joe Biden 2020 presidential campaign, Bauer participated in mock debate sessions with Biden, impersonating the Republican candidate Donald Trump. He played the role of Donald Trump again in debate preparation during the 2024 presidential campaign.

In 2021, Bauer served as the co-chair of the bipartisan commission to study reforms to the US Supreme Court and the federal judiciary.

Also in 2021, Bauer joined with Ben Ginsberg, his past co-chair of the Presidential Commission on Election Administration, to found the Election Official Legal Defense Network, a nonprofit project connecting election officials who experience threats, harassment, or exposure to criminal penalties with licensed, qualified pro bono attorneys.

== Personal life ==
Bauer is married to Anita Dunn, the former director of communications at the White House. He has four children, two daughters-in-law, a son-in-law, and three grandchildren. In 2008, Bauer and Dunn were described as Washington's new "power couple" by Newsweek magazine.

== Bibliography ==
- After Trump - Reconstructing the Presidency. Bob Bauer and Jack Goldsmith. Lawfare Institute/Lawfare Press. September 2020. ISBN 9781735480619, 978-1-735-4806-0-2
- The Unraveling - Reflections on Politics without Ethics and Democracy in Crisis. Bob Bauer. Rowman & Littlefield. June 2024. ISBN 9781538191842, 978-1-5381-9185-9

== See also ==
- List of Jewish American jurists

Legal offices
| Preceded by Greg Craig | White House Counsel; 2010–2011 | Succeeded by Kathryn Ruemmler |
