= Ballot curing =

U.S. voting process

Ballot curing (ballot cure) is the process of correcting minor errors, typically involving voter identification issues with mail-in or absentee ballots. Ballot curing allows for certain technical mistakes to be fixed, and potentially make a difference in a close election by counting every legal vote.

Not all states allow for ballot curing, and for those that do, the rules vary state by state. States that do have a process have lower rates of rejected mail ballots. Ballot curing is an effective mechanism for election accuracy and also improves voter trust and participation. Ballot curing systems help legitimate voters by providing safeguards.

== History ==
There has been a shift to mail-in voting since the late 1970s. By 2022, 21% of votes cast were by mail. Mail-in ballots are more likely to have errors as in-person voting has election workers available to answer questions or help resolve technical issues at the time of voting. In 2020, about 560,000 U.S. ballots (about 1%) returned by mail were rejected as having identity verification errors, resulting in those votes not being counted. Those uncounted votes could make a difference in a close election.

In 2020, the Cybersecurity and Infrastructure Security Agency (CISA) published recommendations on how to administer and secure election infrastructure in the United States. They suggest tiered steps for reviewing signatures starting with software based systems, human inspection, then a final step with a bipartisan review team to make a final determination of signature validity.

As of November 6, 2020, there has not been evidence that ballot curing is being used to commit election fraud.

A 2024 Washington State University study found that a third of rejected ballots have a signature that has a discrepancy with the voter’s state ID and one in eight rejected ballots are missing a signature. Of the ballots that are challenged for signature discrepancies, 60% are fixed and counted prior to cerfication of the election.

== Reason ==
The cause of ballot challenges can be incomplete ID information, lacking a witness signature, a missing signature or mismatched signatures. Some explanation for signature discrepancies include "voter signatures change" over time due to health issues or aging, some newer and younger voters did not learn cursive when they were in grammar school nor practice formal signing as with bank checks, expired ID, an outdated address on file, recently married voters may not have updated their name on their voter registration, and voters who may have surnames that do not conform to simple first and last English names used on their driver’s license.

In 2020, the MIT Election Data and Science Lab found that: 2.5% of first-time voters had their ballots rejected, compared to 1.3% of experienced voters. Elderly voters are also more likely to make mistakes that could be corrected.

== Curing process ==
=== Notification process ===
Two-thirds of U.S. states require election officials to notify voters of a missing signature or a signature discrepancy, and stipulate that voters must be given an opportunity to correct it.

Each state has specific reasons that are valid for curing consideration typically involving mismatched or missing voter signatures, and not using required security envelopes. For the Notification process, states' requirements range from "make reasonable efforts to contact the voter" in Arizona, to "shall make an attempt to notify the voter" in Hawaii, to "must contact" voter in California. Time frames and deadlines are typically defined for notification. Notification methods are specified such as by first-class mail, letter or notice, electronic mail or email, telephone and voicemail, text message, or not specified. The Notification process may include an option to send out a replacement ballot. The states' regulations identify the election official responsible for taking the prescribed actions.

When a ballot is challenged, both government election officials and other interested parties, including voting rights groups, candidate campaigns, and political parties, may attempt to contact the voter. Sometimes organizations independently contact voters that were identified in a state's database of challenged ballots. These non-governmental organizations include Common Cause, Loud Light, Movement Voter Project (MVP), NextGen America, Unite Here, and VoteRiders.

Note that the actual vote is not known at the time of notification.

=== Correction process ===
The correction process and requirements vary by state. Corrections include completing and returning an affidavit along with a copy of voter identification, sending a form or document, and submitting a whole new ballot.

In North Carolina, before Election Day, election officials, are to "spoil" a ballot if it is submitted without a witness signature and supply another ballot to the voter.

Pennsylvania is "unique in that it has no statewide standard for ballot curing and instead allows each of the state's 67 counties to set their own policies."

In the Nevada 2022 General Election, 17,734, or 3.3% of all returned mail-in ballots, were flagged for curing. Of those, two thirds were successfully cured with votes being counted.

=== Verification ===
Voters cannot change their votes during the curing process. The verification process only validates identification challenges. In California, results are updated until election certification.

Voters can verify the status of their updated ballot by checking on the state election website.

== Impact on elections ==
A Votebeat and Spotlight PA analysis found that Pennsylvania counties allowing voters to fix errors on mail ballots had lower rejection rates in the 2024 general election. Statewide, 0.57% of mail ballots were rejected, down from previous elections. Counties permitting ballot “curing” had a rejection rate of 0.49%, compared to 0.59% in counties without the policy, meaning 17% fewer ballots were rejected in curing counties.
