= Joint Examining Board =

Joint Examining Board (JEB) was founded in 1912 by J. H. Pitman (of Pitman shorthand fame), JEB offers a range of up-to-date qualifications to support information and communication technologies (ICT) teaching and the skills development of staff in FE, schools, and other organisations. JEB uses Distance Learning to deliver its course material. A number of training colleges in the UK and Ireland run specific courses aimed at facilitating students attaining the JEB qualifications. JEB is part of the JHP Group.

There are a number of JEB qualifications aligned to the UK National Qualifications Framework (NQF).
