= Valuation joint board =

In Scotland, a valuation joint board is a public body that is responsible for property valuations for local tax purposes across multiple council areas. Each board is made up of a number of members appointed by the local councils in its area.

The official that is responsible for property valuations is the Assessor. In most areas, the Assessor is also the electoral registration officer, responsible for maintaining the electoral roll.

== List of valuation joint boards ==
The following valuation joint boards exist as of 2023:

Valuation joint board	Council areas
Ayrshire Valuation Joint Board	East Ayrshire, North Ayrshire, South Ayrshire
Central Scotland Valuation Joint Board	Clackmannanshire, Falkirk, Stirling
Dunbartonshire and Argyll and Bute Valuation Joint Board	Argyll and Bute, West Dunbartonshire, East Dunbartonshire
Grampian Valuation Joint Board	Aberdeen, Aberdeenshire, Moray
Highland & Western Isles Valuation Joint Board	Highland, Western Isles
Lanarkshire Valuation Joint Board	North Lanarkshire, South Lanarkshire
Lothian Valuation Joint Board	Edinburgh, East Lothian, Midlothian, West Lothian
Orkney & Shetland Valuation Joint Board	Orkney Islands, Shetland Islands
Renfrewshire Valuation Joint Board	Inverclyde, East Renfrewshire, Renfrewshire
Tayside Valuation Joint Board	Angus, Dundee, Perth and Kinross

Dumfries and Galloway, Fife, Glasgow and Scottish Borders are not part of a valuation joint board, and each appoints its own Assessor.

== See also ==
- Council Tax in Scotland
- Scottish Assessors
