= Voter identification laws in the United States =

Voter ID laws in the US are laws that require a person to provide some form of official identification before they are permitted to register to vote, receive a ballot for an election, or to actually vote in elections in the United States.

Voter ID laws by state, as of August 2025: Photo ID required (strict) Photo ID requested (non-strict) Non-photo ID required (strict) Non-photo ID requested (non-strict) No ID required to vote

At the federal level, the Help America Vote Act of 2002 requires a voter ID for all new voters in federal elections who registered by mail and who did not provide a driver's license number or the last four digits of a Social Security number that was matched against government records. Though state laws requiring some sort of identification at voting polls go back to 1950, no state required a voter to produce a government-issued photo ID as a condition for voting before the 2006 elections. Indiana became the first state to enact a strict photo ID law, which was struck down by two lower courts before being upheld in Crawford v. Marion County Election Board by the U.S. Supreme Court. As of 2021, 36 states have enacted some form of voter ID requirement.

Voter ID requirements are generally popular among Americans, with polls showing broad support across demographic groups, though they are also a divisive issue. Proponents of voter ID laws argue that they reduce electoral fraud and increase voter confidence while placing only little burden on voters. Opponents point to the lack of evidence of meaningful fraud and studies that failed to find voter ID laws increasing voter confidence or decreasing fraud. They further argue that the laws, pushed mainly by Republicans, are partisan and designed to make voting harder for demographic groups who tend to vote for Democrats, such as low-income people, people of color, younger voters and transgender people.

While research has shown mixed results, studies have generally found that voter ID laws have little if any impact on voter turnout or election outcomes. Voter ID laws are more likely to impact people of color. Research has also shown that Republican legislators in swing states, states with rapidly diversifying populations, and districts with sizable black, Latino, or immigrant populations have pushed the hardest for voter ID laws. Lawsuits have been filed against many voter ID requirements on the basis that they are discriminatory with an intent to reduce voting, with parts of voter ID laws in several states having been overturned by courts. A 2019 study and a 2021 study found voter ID laws have a negligible impact on voter fraud, which is extremely rare.

== State-by-state voter ID requirements ==
The National Conference of State Legislatures (NCSL) provides a web page and a map with ID requirements for voting in each state. In states with strict ID laws, the voter is required to take additional action after the provisional ballot is cast to verify ID. The NCSL website describes strict states as follows:

In the "strict" states, a voter cannot cast a valid ballot without first presenting ID. Voters who are unable to show ID at the polls are given a provisional ballot. Those provisional ballots are kept separate from the regular ballots. If the voter returns to election officials within a short period of time after the election (generally a few days) and presents acceptable ID, the provisional ballot is counted. If the voter does not come back to show ID, that provisional ballot is never counted.

In states with non-strict voter ID laws, other methods of validation are allowed, which vary by state. Possible alternatives are: signing an affidavit, having a poll worker vouch for voter, having election officials verify a voter's identity after the vote is cast, or having the voter return an inquiry mailed to their reported address.

The NCSL categorizes state-level voter ID laws as follows, as of 2024:

- Photo ID required (strict): Arkansas, Georgia, Indiana, Kansas, Mississippi, New Hampshire, North Carolina, Ohio, Tennessee, and Wisconsin.
- Photo ID requested (non-strict): Alabama, Florida, Idaho, Louisiana, Michigan, Missouri, Montana, Nebraska, Rhode Island, South Carolina, South Dakota, and Texas.
- Non-photo ID required (strict): Arizona, North Dakota, and Wyoming.
- Non-photo ID requested (non-strict): Alaska, Colorado, Connecticut, Delaware, Iowa, Kentucky, New Hampshire, Oklahoma, Utah, Virginia, Washington, and West Virginia.
- No ID required to vote at ballot box: California, Hawaii, Illinois, Maine, Maryland, Massachusetts, Minnesota, Nevada, New Jersey, New Mexico, New York, Oregon, Pennsylvania (where a 2012 strict voter ID law was struck down by the state Supreme Court), Vermont, and Washington, D.C.

== History ==
=== Early history ===
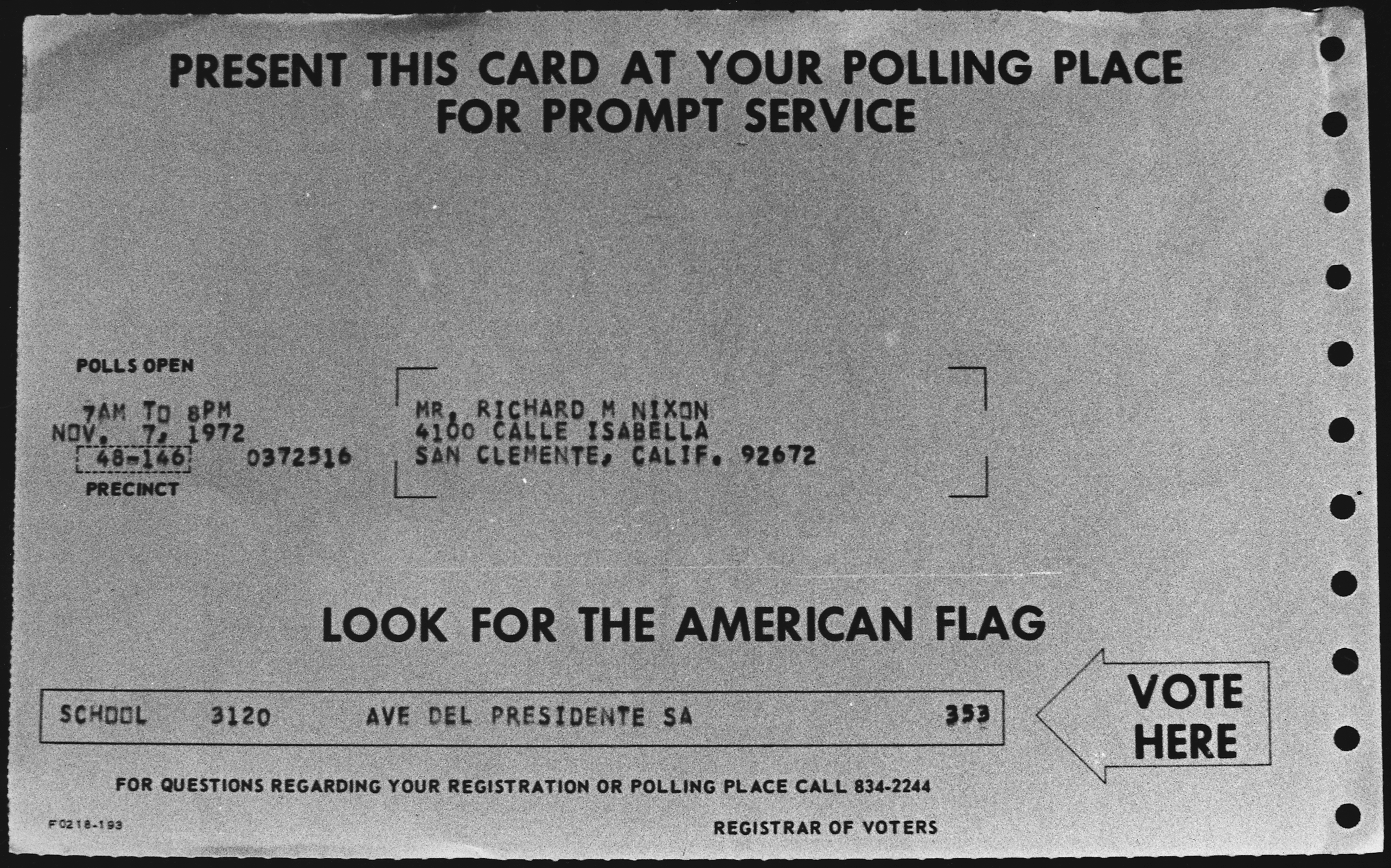
California voter ID card for the 1972 US presidential election issued to Richard Nixon at his local address

Voter ID laws go back to 1950, when South Carolina became the first state to start requesting identification from voters at the polls. The identification document did not have to include a picture; any document with the name of the voter sufficed. In 1970, Hawaii joined in requiring ID, and Texas a year later. Florida was next in 1977, and Alaska in 1980 to become the first five states in the United States to request identification of some sort from voters at the polls.

In 1999, governor of Virginia Jim Gilmore attempted to start a pilot program that required voters to show IDs at the polls. His initiative was blocked by Democrats and the NAACP, and was stopped by court order. His administration had spent and mailed $275,000 worth of free voter ID cards to residents in Arlington and Fairfax counties.

Since the late 20th century, the Republican Party has led efforts to create more stringent voter ID laws for the stated objective of preventing voter fraud. In 2002, President George W. Bush signed the Help America Vote Act into law, which required all first-time voters in federal elections to show photo or non-photo ID upon either registration or arrival at the polling place. It recommended states provide an expansive list of options, including without photos, such as utility bills or government checks.

In 2004, Arizona passed a law requiring voters to bring a state-issued photo ID to the polling place. Similar proposals were later discussed in various other states and were passed in some cases. In several states, a person's citizenship status is noted on their photo ID.

A 2005 report by the bipartisan Commission on Federal Election Reform, chaired by former President Jimmy Carter and former Secretary of State James Baker, concluded that concerns of both those who support and oppose strengthened voter ID laws were legitimate. It recommended voter ID requirements be enacted, to be slowly phased in over a period of five years, and accompanied by the issuance of free ID cards provided by mobile ID vans that would visit traditionally underserved communities.

==== Crawford v. Marion County Election Board ====
An Indiana law requiring a photo ID be shown by all voters before casting ballots went into effect on July 1, 2005. Civil rights groups in Indiana launched a lawsuit, Crawford v. Marion County Election Board, that reached the Supreme Court in 2008. The Court ruled that the law was constitutional, paving the way for expanded ID laws in other states.

=== 2011 - 2016 ===
In 2011, Wisconsin Governor Scott Walker (WI Act 23) and Ohio Governor John Kasich enacted similar voter ID laws. Texas Governor Rick Perry placed a voter ID bill as an "emergency item" in 2011, allowing legislators to rush it through the process. Jurisdiction over Texas election procedure had been given to the Department of Justice, which was required to pre-clear the law for approval. The Texas law recognized government-issued photo identification and weapons permits but not college IDs, resulting in criticism that the law was unfavorable to young voters, who trend liberal, while favorable to gun owners, who trend conservative. Rhode Island passed a voter ID law in 2011; it is the only state with a Democratic-controlled legislature to do so.

In South Carolina, Gov. Nikki Haley enacted a 2011 law requiring government-issued IDs at the polls, which included provisions for the issuance of free IDs. Haley made a one-time offer to arrange for voter ID applicants to be driven to issuing locations. The ID requirement was blocked by the Justice Department.

Wisconsin's Voter ID law in 2011 provided free IDs to people who did not have them. But in practice, state employees at the DMV were instructed to provide the IDs for free only if people specifically asked to have their fee waived. The requirement to show photo ID had been declared in violation of the Wisconsin Constitution and blocked by state and federal judges, but those decisions were overturned by the Wisconsin Supreme Court and later the 7th Circuit Court of Appeals. Weeks later, the U.S. Supreme Court again blocked the law for 2014. On March 23, 2015, the U.S. Supreme Court rejected an appeal by the ACLU, effectively upholding the 7th Circuit's decision Wisconsin's voter ID law as constitutional.

Pennsylvania's voter ID law adopted in 2012 allowed various forms of photo identification cards, including those held by drivers, government employees, in-state college students, and residents of elder-care facilities. Voters who do not possess these forms of identification can obtain voting-only photo IDs issued by the Pennsylvania Department of State through the Pennsylvania Department of Transportation (PennDOT). A judicial order on October 2, 2012, blocked enforcement of Pennsylvania's law until after the 2012 Presidential election. Following a trial in the summer of 2013 and a six-month delay, Commonwealth Court Judge Bernard L. McGinley struck down Pennsylvania's voter ID law on January 17, 2014, as violative of the constitutional rights of state voters. He noted that required alternative voter IDs were available only through 71 PennDOT Drivers Licensing Centers across the state. Five of the 71 DLCs are located in Philadelphia, nine counties have no DLCs at all, and DLCs have limited hours: in nine counties they are open only one day per week, and in 13 counties they are open only two days per week. The court ruled that the Pennsylvania Department of State provided too little access, no financial support to provide IDs to those without access, and no alternatives to obtaining the required IDs. Judge McGinley found that this leaves about half of Pennsylvania without DLCs for five days a week, imposing a significant barrier to obtaining Pennsylvania's "free ID". Photo IDs are not required to vote in PA.

Voters in Minnesota rejected a voter ID proposal on the 2012 general election ballot by a margin of 54–46%. It is the only such ballot defeat for a voter ID law in the country.

==== Shelby County v. Holder (2013) ====
Some states pursuing new photo identification requirements had been required by the Voting Rights Act of 1965 to get federal preclearance prior to enacting new election laws. However, in the 2013 case Shelby County v. Holder, the United States Supreme Court struck down section 4(b) of the Act, which contained the formula that determined, based on historic racial discrimination, which states were required to seek preclearance. The court ruled the section unconstitutional, finding that although the provision had been rational and necessary at the time it had been enacted, changing demographics had rendered its formula inaccurate and no longer applicable. As a result, in states previously required to have preclearance, statutes requiring voter ID were able to immediately take effect .

=== 2017 ===
By the end of August 2017, federal courts had struck down voter ID laws in Ohio, Texas, North Carolina and Wisconsin. The court ruled that the legislature's ending of Ohio's "Golden Week" imposed a "modest burden" on the right to vote of African Americans and said that the state's justifications for the law "fail to outweigh that burden." This week had been a period of time when residents could "register to vote and cast an early ballot at the same location." In 2017, the Texas law was initially struck down at the District level on the grounds that it intended discriminate against black and Hispanic voters, but the decision was reversed by the 5th Circuit. A North Carolina law was overturned as "its provisions deliberately target African-Americans with almost surgical precision … in an effort to depress black turnout at the polls." North Carolina appealed to the US Supreme Court, which declined to hear the appeal, allowing the prior federal court decision to stand. Parts of Wisconsin's voter ID laws were ruled to be unconstitutional and it was advised to accept more forms of identification for the fall 2016 election cycle.

=== 2020-present ===
According to a 2021 report by the Brennan Center for Justice, the states of Arkansas, Florida, Georgia, Montana, New Hampshire, Texas, and Wyoming all enacted harsher voter ID requirements that year. Republican members of the American Legislative Exchange Council (ALEC) have often introduced voter identification laws, which were then signed by Republican governors.

The proliferation of voter ID laws has prompted nonpartisan, nonprofit organizations like League of Women Voters and VoteRiders to work with and for U.S. citizens so that everyone who is eligible to cast a vote can do so.

=== Shelby County v. Holder ===
On June 25, 2013, the US Supreme Court declared, by a 5–4 decision, in Shelby County v. Holder that Section 4(b) of the Voting Rights Act of 1965 was unconstitutional. Previously, states with a history of proven voter discrimination were required to obtain preclearance from a federal court before making changes to their voting laws. Section 4 of the Act contained the formula for determining which states or political subdivisions were covered by Section 5. The majority opinion argued that the formula used to determine which jurisdictions required federal oversight or preclearance had not been updated to reflect current social conditions, including a decline in institutionalized discrimination and direct voter suppression. The states previously covered under section 5 were: Alabama, Alaska, Arizona, Georgia, Louisiana, Mississippi, South Carolina, Texas, and Virginia, as well as parts of California, Florida, Michigan, New York, North Carolina, and South Dakota. By ruling these restrictions to be unconstitutional, it rendered section 5 unenforceable under the current formula.

Since the Court's decision, several states passed new voter ID laws and other restrictions on registration and on voting. Within 24 hours of the Shelby County verdict, Texas, North Carolina, Mississippi, and Alabama, four states that were previously covered by Section 5 of the Voting Rights Act of 1965 began to implement or stated intentions to implement strict photo ID policies. Texas' proposed policy required a voter to show their passport, driver license or other form of photo ID before they could cast their ballot. However, this policy was found to be discriminatory to black and Hispanic voters, and so it was adapted to include the provision for voters to be able to cast a ballot if they signed an affidavit explaining why they could not obtain a form of photo ID and showed an alternate form of ID, such as a utility bill. According to a 2018 Brennan Center report, states that previously needed preclearance have purged voters off their rolls at a much higher rate than other states. Additionally, according to another Brennan Center 2018 Poll on the State of Voting, most of the states that were previously covered by Section 5, have recently enacted laws or other measures that restricted voting rights.

Edward K. Olds argues in his December 2017 Columbia Law Review Article "More than "Rarely Used": A Post-"Shelby" Judicial Standard For Section 3 Preclearance" that in the wake of the defeat of Section 5 of the Voting Rights Act, which was struck down by Shelby County v. Holder, Section 3 could take on a very similar role. Section 3 states that a federal judge can require a jurisdiction to seek pre approval for future policies if it found to be in violation of the Fourteenth or Fifteenth Amendments, however, states that this is unlikely in the current political climate.

In the 2015 Phylon article "A Response to Shelby County, Alabama v. Holder: Energizing, Educating and Empowering Voters," June Gary Hopps and Dorcas Davis Bowles argue that by eliminating section 5 of the Voting Rights Act, Shelby County v. Holder decreased the participation of minorities and that "The participation of these groups is not only important because of the implications for ensuring civil rights, but also for developing social capital within neighborhoods, and increasing positive inter-group relations." This article also states that combined with the Citizens United Supreme Court decision, there is an extreme potential for erosion to civil rights gains, that could "further alienate disenfranchised people."

In the Berkeley Journal of African-American Law & Policy article "The Blinding Color of Race: Elections and Democracy in the Post-Shelby County Era" Sahar Aziz that "the majority in Shelby County lost sight of the objective of the VRA. This historic law was not merely about preventing the most extreme levels or forms of discrimination, but rather having in place a regime that is preventative in nature so as to ensure discrimination continues to decrease and eliminates the possibility of returning to a period of systemic disenfranchisement."

Desmond S. King and Rogers M. Smith argue in their Du Bois Review article "The Last Stand?" that although Shelby v. Holder represents a barrier to African-American political participation, efforts to disproportionately decrease the political power of minorities will long-term, fail to prevent increases in political gains for minorities. However, "they threaten to foster severe conflicts in American politics for years to come."

The practical effect of striking out section 4(b) of the Voting Rights Act in the Shelby County case was that a challenge to electoral law changes in covered states could no longer be determined by a federal administrative or judicial officer, instead having to be litigated in a court of law on a case-by-case basis, a much more costly and time-consuming process.

== Proof of citizenship laws ==
Proponents of proof of citizenship laws cite a desire to stop noncitizens from voting illegally and increase confidence in election systems. Opponents argue there are sufficient safeguards in place already to prevent noncitizen voting (which is very rare), and that requiring proof of citizenship could disenfranchise the millions of eligible voters who cannot easily access such documents.

=== Existing processes to prevent noncitizen voting ===
The federal form to register a voter requires a unique identification number such as a Social Security or driver's license number and that voters check a box attesting that they are a citizen, though documentary proof of citizenship is not required. The extent to which states verify the citizenship of voters varies. Examples include checking registrations against DMV or Social Security files, or using the Systematic Alien Verification for Entitlements (SAVE) database. When noncitizens are added to voter rolls, it is usually by mistake, as the result of a federal law that requires states to offer people voter registration when they visit a motor vehicle office. Sometimes it also appears that more noncitizens are on voter rolls than there are because they became naturalized citizens but have not yet been back to the DMV to update their citizenship status in the DMV database.

=== Impact on voters ===
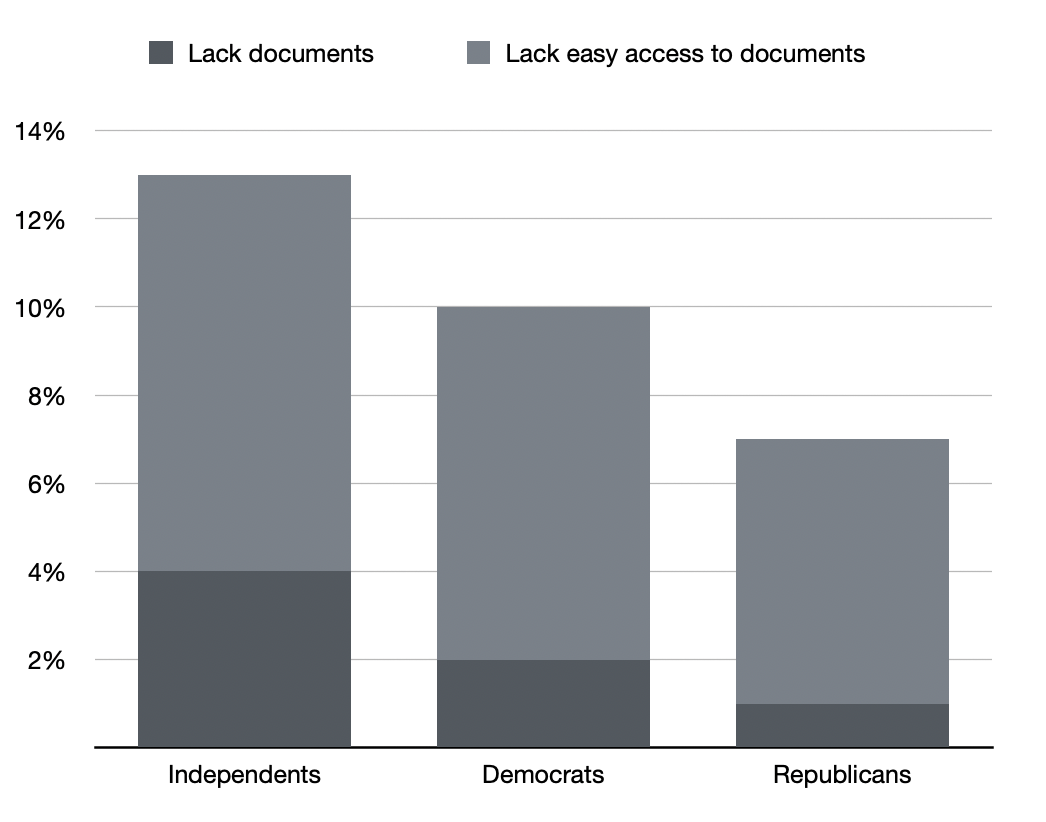
Lack of citizenship documentation by political party (2024)

A June 2024 Brennan Center study estimates that 21.3 million citizens (9% of voters) do not have easy access to documentary proof of citizenship. For some, the documents may be in a bank or in a family member's home in another state. For others, it can be difficult for some to navigate the bureaucracy to replace a faded document.

The Brennan Center estimates that 3.8 million citizens lack access to any form of documentary proof of citizenship. According to the survey, about 4% of Independents, 2% of Democrats and 1% of Republicans lacked proof-of-citizenship documents. Often it is because the documents were lost, destroyed or stolen. Sometimes this is due to a person (usually older) being born outside of a hospital.

=== Legislation ===
==== National ====
In July 2024, the United States House of Representatives passed the Safeguard American Voter Eligibility (SAVE) Act, H.R. 8281, which would mandate that Americans show proof of citizenship when registering to vote. The documents required to get registered to vote would have to meet the guidelines as the documents needed to get a Real ID, but also indicate US citizenship. Usually, a driver license does not indicate citizenship, with notable exceptions in some states near the Canadian border. The act would not take steps to allow for social security numbers to be used, and could create issues if the birth certificate or other document does not match the name due to marriage or divorce. The bill also threatens election workers with jail time if they register a noncitizen.

According to The Guardian, "The bill could lead to people who are able to vote, such as naturalized citizens, college students and tribal voters, being removed from voter rolls." Sean Morales-Doyle of the Brennan Center for Justice argued the bill is designed to call into question the legitimacy of the 2024 election so that it would be easier to overturn if Trump lost. Philip Bump argued the proposal is based on falsehoods about voter fraud and immigrants, and provides justification for partisan voter suppression. Biden promised to veto it. The League of Women Voters also opposes the bill. In 2025, it was considered unlikely to become law due to Democratic opposition.

In January 2025, Texas Representative Chip Roy reintroduced the SAVE Act. Axios noted that it was unlikely that seven Democratic senators would vote for the bill to overcome the filibuster.

Voting rights groups said that the bill will prove to be a major barrier for almost 69 million American women and 4 million men who do not have a birth certificate that matches their legal name. Those who changed their legal name for marriage or to change their gender identity will face trouble while voting. They also fear that the bill will deprive other marginalized communities who are less likely to have proper documentation of voting. Almost 21.3 million people do not have the documents on hand to prove their citizenship and warned against the bill getting rid of other ways of voter registration, such as online, mail, and registration drives. Non-citizens rarely vote, and it is considered illegal.

==== Kansas ====
In the 2018 Fish v. Kobach case, U.S. District Court Judge Julie Robinson ruled that Kansas' proof of citizenship law was unconstitutional, in part because the state did not demonstrate any meaningful illegal noncitizen voting occurred, which would be needed in order to justify the undue burden it put on younger voters and those without a political party. According to ProPublica, Robinson "lacerated" the testimony by Hans von Spakovsky (a member of Trump's voter fraud commission) and Jesse Richman as misleading and unsupported, while also describing von Spakovsky as making "false assertions". Richard Hasen called parts of Richman's testimony "social science at its worst" and said Spakovsky having a serious credibility problem with a history of not retracting false claims. An appeals court confirmed the ruling in 2020, citing how of the 39 noncitizens that appear on the Kansas voter rolls, most of them could be due to administrative anomalies. The voter rolls also had 100 people with birth dates in the 1800s and 400 people with birth dates after their registration dates in the database. The court also said the law had an undue impact by canceling or suspending the voter registrations of 31,089 voters.

==== Arizona ====
In the 2013 Arizona v. Inter Tribal Council of Arizona, Inc., the U.S. Supreme Court ruling that Arizona's proof of citizenship law violated the 1993 National Voter Registration Act for federal elections.

In 2023, Jesse Richman examined Arizona state voter and DMV files along with CES data as an expert witness for the case Mi Familia Vota v. Fontes challenging the law. Using DMV data, Richman said that he found 1,934 registered voters (0.04% of all registered voters) whose records indicated they were noncitizens at the time of registration or afterward, and estimated that around half a percent of noncitizens had voted nationwide. U.S. District Judge Susan R. Bolton wrote that she found Richman's testimony credible and that the law was not passed with discriminatory intent. Justin Levitt, a skeptic of Richman's earlier research, said that while the CES data looked more reliable than in Richman's prior work, more information was needed to assess its reliability, and that actual turnout among noncitizens could be lower than Richman estimated. Brian Schaffner "rejects the use of the CES to study noncitizens entirely". Judge Bolton upheld some provisions of the law while striking down provisions like requiring applicants to list place of birth and issued an injunction against requiring documentary proof of citizenship when using the state form to register to vote for federal elections.

In August 2024, in Republican National Committee v. Mi Familia Vota the Supreme Court allowed Arizona to temporarily enforce the law requiring proof of citizenship to register to vote using the state's registration forms (federal forms do not require documentation), pending appeal. The ACLU and League of Women Voters submitted briefs against the law arguing it would disenfranchise voters. According to The Guardian, the law has negatively impacted tribal voters and college students. Analysis by Votebeat found a higher concentration of people living near college campuses who could only vote in federal elections due to the law being enforced for state elections.

== Studies and analysis ==
=== Costs ===
According to a Harvard Law report, getting documentation, possible travel, and waiting time (at a DMV, for example) are significant—especially for minority group and low-income voters. The author of the study notes that the costs associated with obtaining the card far exceeds the $1.50 poll tax (equivalent to $12.00 in 2025) outlawed by the 24th amendment in 1964.

Costs are also borne by get out the vote nonprofits organizations and volunteers who must spend more time and money trying to help people to get an updated ID in order to be able to register to vote.

=== Disparate impact ===
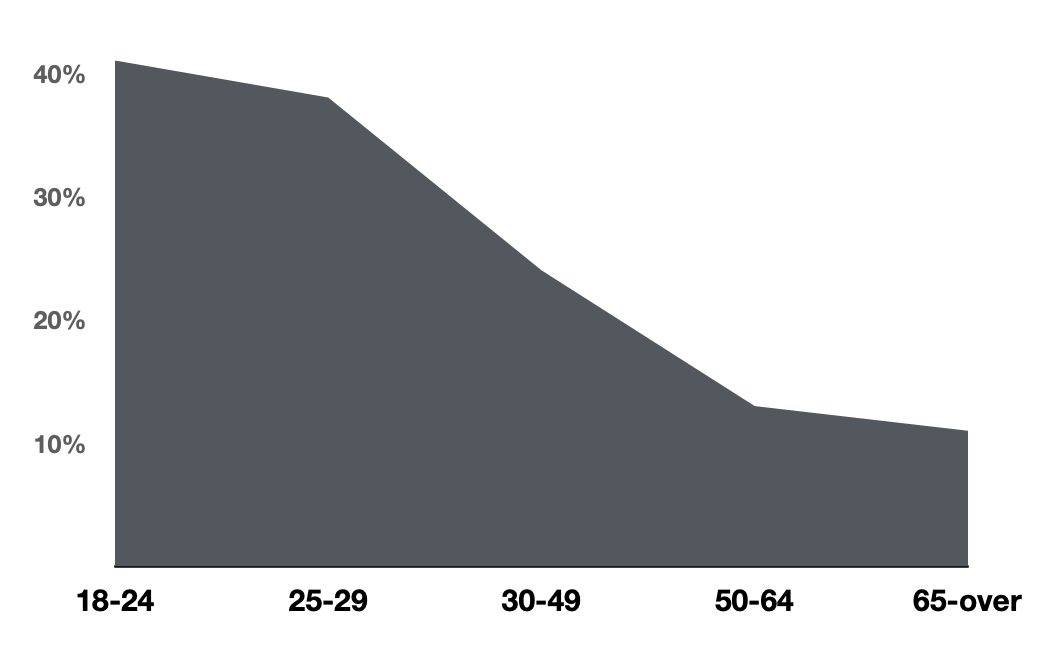
Eligible voters without an updated photo ID by age

Low-income people, people of color and younger voters are less likely to have ID. However, at least 90% of people in every major ethnic group in the United States have photo ID. They're led by Pacific Islanders with just 1.6% of them lacking photo identification.

==== Age ====
As of 2023, Republican-run states had been making it harder for young people to vote by restricting their use of student IDs, among other efforts. According to a report from the University of Maryland, 18-29 year-olds were the group least likely to have the required form of photo ID.

==== Disability ====
Voter ID laws are harder on Americans with disabilities. This is in part because a higher percentage of people with a disability are less likely to have any form of photo ID, in part because of difficulties accessing DMVs and tracking down all the necessary documentation.

==== Gender identity ====
A 2020 study by the Williams Institute estimated that 260,000 Americans who have transitioned and were eligible to vote in the 2020 US elections did not have a form of ID that accurately reflect their names or gender identity. 25% of respondents reported having experienced verbal harassment from poll workers when their ID did not match their current names or identity.

==== Income ====
Some studies have also found that ID laws can disproportionately disenfranchise lower-income voters.

==== Political party ====
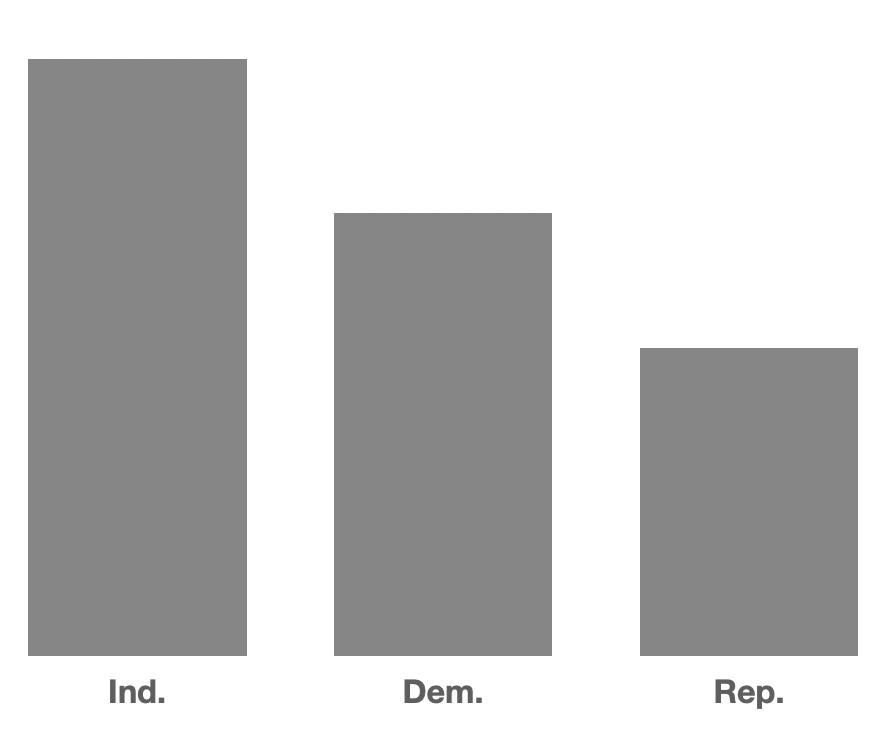
Lack of updated Photo ID by political party membership

A 2012 analysis by Nate Silver found that voter ID laws seem to decrease turnout by between 0.8% and 2.4%, depending on how strict they are, and tend to cause a shift towards the Republican candidate of between 0.4% and 1.2%. Silver found that the statistical reasoning was flawed in a number of studies which had found small effects but had described them as not statistically significant.

A 2024 survey led by researchers at the University of Maryland found that 23% of Democrats, 16% of Republicans and 31% of independents did not have a license with their current name and address.

==== Race ====
In 2012, an investigation by Reuters found that voter ID laws in Georgia and Indiana had not led to lower turnout of minorities and concluded that concerns about this "are probably overstated". In a 2014 review by the Government Accountability Office of the academic literature, three studies out of five found that voter ID laws reduced minority turnout whereas two studies found no significant impact.

Charges of racial discrimination in voter ID laws are founded in the disparate impact doctrine of constitutional law, which claims that any action—intentional or unintentional—that statistically disadvantages a protected class constitutes discrimination. Disparate impact is most often discussed in the context of African Americans. The moral validity and constitutionality of this doctrine is hotly debated. This is relevant to voter ID laws because of accusations that these laws disproportionately reduce turnout among minority voters. According to an assessment of the existing research on voter ID laws by University of Pennsylvania political scientist Dan Hopkins, the research indicates that voter ID laws do disproportionately disenfranchise minority voters. Research also shows that racial minorities are less likely to possess IDs. Disparate impact's legal presence has been drastically reduced by the Supreme Court in cases like Louisiana V. Callais with the court that stating only legislation with intentional impact could be challenged.

Federal appeals courts have struck down strict voter-ID laws in Texas and North Carolina, citing intent by the legislatures to discriminate against minority voters. The appeals court noted that the North Carolina Legislature "requested data on the use, by race, of a number of voting practices"—then, data in hand, "enacted legislation that restricted voting and registration in five different ways, all of which disproportionately affected African Americans." The changes to the voting process "target African Americans with almost surgical precision," and "impose cures for problems that did not exist."

A 2008 study found that the strictest voter ID laws reduced voter turnout relative to the most lax form of such laws (stating one's name). The same study reported that "the stricter voter identification requirements depress turnout to a greater extent for less educated and lower income populations, for both minorities and non-minorities." A 2009 study found that 84% of white registered voters in Indiana had access to photo ID to comply with that state's ID law, as compared to 78% of black voters on the rolls there. A 2008 study found that African Americans, Hispanics, and the elderly were less likely to have a voter ID that complied with Georgia's voter ID law.

A 2014 study by the Government Accountability Office reported that voter ID laws in Kansas and Tennessee reduced turnout in these states by 1.9 and 2.2 percent, respectively, compared to four states that did not pass voter ID laws—Alabama, Arkansas, Delaware, and Maine. The study indicates that young people, black people, and newly registered voters were most likely to have their turnout reduced. But Tennessee officials suggested that the reduced turnout may have been due to a lack of compelling ballot measures in 2012, and Kansas officials dismissed the drop in black voters as a product of high random variance in a small population. Tennessee officials questioned the reproducibility of this report, given its reliance on data from Catalist, which they claimed was a progressive political group.

A 2014 study from the University of Iowa found no evidence that strict voter ID laws reduce minority turnout. A 2012 study found that, although the Georgia voter ID laws lowered overall turnout by 0.4%, there was no racial or ethnic component to the suppression effect.

Disparate impact may also be reflected in access to information about voter ID laws. A 2015 experimental study found that election officials queried about voter ID laws were slightly more likely to respond to emails from a non-Latino Anglo or European name (70.5% response rate) than a Latino name (64.8% response rate), though response accuracy was similar across those groups.

Studies have also analyzed racial differences in ID requests rates. A 2012 study in the city of Boston found strong evidence that non-white voters were more likely to be asked for ID during the 2008 election. According to exit polls, 23% of whites, 33% of Asians, 33% of blacks, and 38% of Hispanics were asked for ID, though this effect is partially attributed to black and Hispanics preferring non-peak voting hours when election officials inspected a greater portion of IDs. Precinct differences confound the data, as black and Hispanic voters tended to vote at black and Hispanic-majority precincts.

A 2010 study of the 2006 midterm election in New Mexico found that election officials asked Hispanics for ID more often than they did early voters, women, and non-Hispanics. A 2009 study of the 2006 midterm elections nationwide found that 47% of white voters reported being asked to show photo identification at the polls, compared with 54% of Hispanics and 55% of African Americans." Very few people were denied the chance to vote as a result of voter identification requests. A 2015 study found that turnout among blacks in Georgia was generally higher since the state began enforcing its strict voter ID law.

A 2017 study in the Journal of Politics "shows that strict identification laws have a differentially negative impact on the turnout of racial and ethnic minorities in primaries and general elections. We also find that voter ID laws skew democracy toward those on the political right." The results of this study were challenged in a paper by Stanford political scientist Justin Grimmer and four other political scientists. The paper says that the findings in the aforementioned study "a product of data inaccuracies, the presented evidence does not support the stated conclusion, and alternative model specifications produce highly variable results. When errors are corrected, one can recover positive, negative, or null estimates of the effect of voter ID laws on turnout, precluding firm conclusions." In a response, the authors of the original study dismissed the aforementioned criticisms, and stood by the findings of the original article. Columbia University statistician and political scientist Andrew Gelman said that the response by the authors of the original study "did not seem convincing" and that the finding of racial discrepancies in the original study does not stand.

A 2017 report by Civis Analytics for the liberal super PAC Priorities USA purported to show that Hillary Clinton lost Wisconsin the 2016 presidential election due to voter suppression brought on by Wisconsin's strict voter ID laws. Political scientists expressed serious skepticism of the report's methodology; Yale University political scientist Eitan Hersh said the report "does not meet acceptable evidence standards." A 2017 paper by University of Wisconsin-Madison political scientists Kenneth Mayer and Michael DeCrescenzo also purported to show that voter suppression swayed Wisconsin from Clinton; this paper was also rebutted by other political scientists on the basis of poor methodology.

A 2019 study in the journal Electoral Studies found that the implementation of voter ID laws in South Carolina reduced overall turnout but did not have a disparate impact. 2019 studies in Political Science Quarterly and the Atlantic Economic Journal found no evidence that voter ID laws have a disproportionate influence on minorities.

A 2022 study found that Black and Latino voters were disproportionately likely to vote without ID.

A 2024 University of Maryland report evaluating the 2020 election found that participants who were Black or Hispanic were twice as likely to report not having a photo ID.

=== Impact on fraud ===
A 2019 study found voter ID laws have a negligible impact on voter fraud, which is already extremely rare.

A 2021 paper by University of Bologna and Harvard Business School economists Enrico Cantoni and Vincent Pons found that voter ID laws had no effect on fraud, actual or perceived. "Overall, our findings suggest that efforts to improve elections may be better directed at other reforms."

=== Overall turnout ===
Studies of the effects of voter ID laws on turnout in the United States have generally found that such laws have little, if any, effect on turnout. This may be because these laws do not reduce turnout very much; it may also be because the strictest voter ID laws have the largest effect on turnout, and they have only been enacted relatively recently. Although most Americans possess a government-issued photo ID, those without ID may have trouble acquiring the proper credentials, lowering their turnout. The most comprehensive study of voter IDs, a 2017 study by Harvard political scientist Stephen Ansolabehere and Tufts political scientist Eitan Hersh, found that in Texas, 1.5% of those who showed up to vote in the 2012 election lacked the kinds of IDs that are targeted by voter ID laws, 4.5% of the total eligible population lacked them, 7.5% of black registered voters lack them. The numbers are likely higher in states with more urban areas, as fewer voters have driving licenses. A 2011 study by New York University's Brennan Center estimated that of the US population that is of voting age, 6–11% lack government-issued photo ID.

Since some legitimate voters lack the kind of IDs demanded by voter ID laws, some commentators have argued that strict voter ID laws reduce voter turnout, especially among poor, black, elderly, disabled, and minority-language voters, and voters who have changed their names. However, the results of studies assessing the effect (or lack thereof) of these laws on turnout have been inconclusive. For example, a 2012 study found that a stricter voter ID law in Georgia lowered turnout by about 0.4% in 2008 compared to 2004. A 2006 study also found that voter ID laws decreased aggregate turnout by between 3 and 4 percent. In contrast, several other studies have failed to demonstrate significant turnout reductions. A 2010 study found that 1.2% of registered voters in three states with voter ID laws (Indiana, Maryland, and Mississippi) lacked an ID that complied with the law. A 2011 study found that photo ID laws were correlated with a 1.6% decline in turnout, and non-photo ID laws were correlated with a 2.2% decline. In a 2014 review by the Government Accountability Office of the academic literature, five studies out of ten found that voter ID laws had no significant effect on overall turnout, four studies found that voter ID laws decreased overall turnout, and one study found that the laws increased overall turnout.

A 2007 report found a small increase in Democratic turnout in places with new voter ID laws.

A 2014 Rice University study reported that Texas's voter ID law decreased turnout mainly among people who incorrectly thought they did not have the type of ID needed to comply with the law. The authors of this study also suggested that an education campaign aimed at clearly communicating what types of ID are acceptable in Texas would be beneficial.

A 2016 study argued that, although no clear-cut relationship exists between strict voter ID laws and voter turnout, the disenfranchising impact of voter ID laws may be hidden by Democratic voter mobilization. Strong negative reactions to voter ID laws among Democratic constituencies could, in theory, boost Democratic turnout enough to compensate for effects of the laws themselves.

A 2017 study found that 474 people tried to vote in Virginia's 2014 Senate election, but could not do so because they lacked the proper ID to comply with the state's voter ID law. The same study found that turnout was higher in parts of the state where registered voters were less likely to have a driver's license. The authors suggested that "This unexpected relationship might be explained by a targeted Department of Elections mailing, suggesting that the initial impact of voter ID laws may hinge on efforts to notify voters likely to be affected."

A 2019 paper by Brown University economists found that the implementation of a photo ID law in Rhode Island led to a decline in turnout, registration, and voting among individuals who did not have drivers' licenses.

A 2021 paper by University of Bologna and Harvard Business School economists Enrico Cantoni and Vincent Pons found that voter ID laws had "no negative effect on registration or turnout, overall or for any group defined by race, gender, age, or party affiliation." It speculated that this was in part because of increased voter mobilization efforts that counteracted the effect.

A 2023 report published in Proceedings of the National Academy of Sciences of the United States of America (PNAS) found that "voter ID requirements motivate and mobilize supporters of both parties, ultimately mitigating their anticipated effects on election results".

=== International comparisons ===
Many nations require some form of voter identification at the polling place, but specific details of the requirement vary widely. In Spain, Greece, France, Belgium, India, and Italy, a government-issued photo ID is required to cast a ballot. Mexico has a similar system, with all registered voters receiving a photo ID upon completing the registration process. Several Western democracies do not require identification for voting, such as Denmark, Australia, and New Zealand. In Ireland and Switzerland, poll workers reserve the right to request identification but are not required to do so. In Canada, identification is required, but voters can provide any two forms of ID from a list of 45 possibilities. Canada's system is more stringent than the 17 U.S. states that do not require ID but less stringent than the 22 U.S. states with strict requirements. The strict Indiana ID system, for instance, accepts only five forms of ID: an Indiana driver's license, an Indiana ID card, a military ID, a US passport, or a student ID card from an in-state college or university.

Several developing nations have instituted voter ID laws. Many Arab nations require voters to leave a fingerprint upon casting a ballot, allowing quick detection of fraud. In 2012, the head of Libya's national election commission expressed surprise that the American system "depends so much on trust and the good faith of election officials and voters alike". The Gambia gives each voter a single marble to cast, ensuring that no one can vote multiple times.

=== Perception of electoral systems ===
Lorraine Minnite of Demos has criticized proponents of voter ID laws for shifting their arguments in favor of such laws from voter fraud to electoral integrity. In an expert report prepared for the ACLU, she argued that "Calling the problem "electoral integrity" does not change the fact that the only threat to electoral integrity addressed by photo ID laws is in-person voter fraud," and that because such fraud is extremely rare, voter ID laws are not justified to prevent this problem.

The 2005 Commission on Federal Election Reform, co-chaired by former President Jimmy Carter and former Secretary of State James Baker, concluded that, although proven voter impersonation is minimal, a photo ID requirement would ensure election integrity and safeguard public perception of the nation's voting system.

Among certain demographics, voter ID laws lower electoral confidence. A 2016 study concluded that Democrats in states with strict ID laws have reduced faith in the electoral system. It said that negative politicization by the Democratic Party may be to blame.

Republicans living in strict photo identification states were more confident in their elections, though possibly due to similar politicization by Republican elites. Another 2015 study found that voters living in states with voter ID laws were not more confident in elections than voters who lived in states without such laws. A 2016 study found that people living in states with voter ID laws were no more confident in their elections than people in states without such laws, nor did they perceive lower rates of voter impersonation fraud. A 2017 study found similar results for both national and local election outcomes.

A 2021 study in the Quarterly Journal of Economics by University of Bologna and Harvard Business School economists Enrico Cantoni and Vincent Pons found no evidence that strict voter ID laws had any effect on fraud – actual or perceived.

=== Public opinion ===
Public opinion polls have shown broad support for voter ID laws among voters in the United States. A 2011 Rasmussen poll found that 75% of likely voters "believe voters should be required to show photo identification, such as a driver's license, before being allowed to vote." A 2012 Fox News poll produced similar results, revealing that 87% of Republicans, 74% of independent voters, and 52% of Democrats supported new voter ID laws.

More recently, A 2021 Monmouth poll found that 56% of self-identified liberals and 84% of nonwhite voters favored photo ID requirements. A 2022 Gallup poll found that 97% of Republicans, 84% of independents and 53% of Democrats favored photo ID requirements. A 2025 Pew Research poll showed 83% of Americans supported requiring voter ID.

Although all major political demographics support voter ID laws, a 2013 study showed significant divergence in opinion between conservative-affiliated demographics, which are staunch supporters, and liberal-affiliated demographics, which are less supportive. The study also showed that support depends on survey framing: when questions biased against voter ID laws are asked, support drops 15% compared to when questions favorable to voter ID laws are asked. A 2016 study showed that emphasizing the adverse effects of voter ID laws on eligible voters decreased popular support for such laws. Another 2016 study found that white people with high levels of implicit racism, but not explicit racism, were more supportive of voter ID laws when they were exposed to a fear-eliciting condition. A 2016 study found that partisan affiliation is a major determinant of support for voter ID laws and that Republicans are much more likely than Democrats to be concerned about voter fraud. Research shows that individuals who hold hostile views towards nonwhite immigrants are most likely to believe that voter fraud is rampant.

Former Attorney General Eric Holder and others have compared the laws to a poll tax, in which southern states during the Jim Crow Era imposed voting fees, which discourage black and even some poor whites until the passage of grandfather clauses from voting.

Some studies have failed to find a correlation between states with Voter ID laws and increased confidence in the voting system.

=== Fraud prevention ===
A stated goal of Voter ID laws is to reduce voter fraud in the United States. However, between 1978 and 2018, no elections were overturned due to voter impersonation fraud, the only kind of fraud a voter ID law could help prevent.

The vast majority of voter ID laws in the United States target only voter impersonation. According to PolitiFact, "in-person voter fraud—the kind targeted by the ID law—remains extremely rare". The available research and evidence point to the type of fraud that would be prevented by voter ID laws as "very rare" or "extremely rare". PolitiFact finds the suggestion that "voter fraud is rampant" false, giving it its "Pants on Fire" rating.

In 2016, PolitiFact noted that it was fair to say "impersonation cases can be hard to count in that they are hard to prove -- particularly when no photo ID requirement is in place and a voter can cast a ballot simply by stating the name of a registered voter."

Writing in 2009, Harvard political scientist Stephen Ansolabehere noted that despite the common belief "that fraud occurs at least somewhat often in elections … social scientists have been unable to develop unambiguous measures of the incidence of fraud, and legal cases find very little hard evidence on the matter." In a 2012 analysis, News21 of the Walter Cronkite School of Journalism surveyed thousands of election officials in 50 states regarding all instances of fraud relating to elections since 2000, and concluded that in-person voter impersonation is virtually non-existent, amounting to one out of about every 15 million prospective voters. In August 2014, Loyola Law School professor Justin Levitt reported in the Washington Post's Wonkblog that he had identified only 31 credible cases of voter impersonation since 2000.

A 2021 study in the Quarterly Journal of Economics by University of Bologna and Harvard Business School economists Enrico Cantoni and Vincent Pons found no evidence that strict voter ID laws had any effect on fraud – actual or perceived.

A 2007 report by the liberal Brennan Center for Justice concluded that voter impersonation was rarer than being struck by lightning. The author of this report, Justin Levitt, later reported in 2014 that he had identified only thirty-one credible instances of voter impersonation since 2000, involving a total of 241 ballots, out of a billion ballots cast. Also, in 2007, Lorraine Minnite released a report for Project Vote concluding that voter fraud was "extremely rare" in the United States. In 2014, a survey was published concluding that there was no evidence of widespread voter impersonation in the 2012 U.S. general election.

Proponents of voter ID laws have pointed to a widely discredited 2014 study by Jesse Richman, Gulshan A. Chatta and David Earnest as justification. The 2014 study did not change the virtual consensus in academia that noncitizen voting did not exist on any functional level. One reason why was a 2015 replication of the study by the managers of the Cooperative Congressional Election Study, the data relied on, found that Richman and Earnest's study was "almost certainly flawed" and that it was most likely that 0% of non-citizens had voted in recent American elections. The Old Dominion study also concluded that voter ID requirements would be ineffective at reducing non-citizen voting. Richman later conceded that "the response error issues … may have biased our numbers", though he stood by the study. Richman rebuked Donald Trump for claiming that millions voted illegally in 2016. In 2017, The New York Times said that the debate has moved on from Richman's study (whose claims it described as having fallen apart) to whether or not any evidence for noncitizen voting exists.

Support for voter ID laws correlates with perceived prevalence of voter fraud. Although absentee ballot fraud is considered to be more common than voter impersonation, only six of the 31 states with voter ID laws also impose similar requirements on people who mail in absentee ballots.

==== Dead voter concerns ====
Most cases of alleged voter fraud involving dead voters, often referred to as "zombie voters", have been shown to be a result of incorrect matching of voter rolls and death records, such as when someone died after they voted rather than before.

Proponents of voter ID laws cite the registration of dead and out-of-state voters as a vulnerability in the electoral system as cause for concern even if there is no evidence of improper voting. A 2012 report by the Pew Center of the 2008 elections showed that more than 1.8 million deceased people remain registered to vote nationwide. The same report found 3 million voters registered in multiple states, presumably due to changes of residency. David Becker, at the time the director of Election Initiatives for Pew, said this study's results pointed to the need to improve voter registration, rather than to evidence of voter fraud or suppression.

Proponents of voter ID laws fear that motivated individuals could exploit registration irregularities to impersonate dead voters or impersonate former state residents, casting multiple fraudulent ballots. They have argued that voter fraud could go undetected without voter ID laws. Critics of such laws note that they only prevent one kind of fraud, namely voter impersonation. They say that this form of fraud is illogical, as the risks (a fine of up to $10,000 and/or 5 years in prison) far outweigh the benefits (casting one extra vote for the voter's desired candidate). Democrats have alleged that the scale of impersonation fraud has been greatly exaggerated by Republicans for political reasons.

A 2012 investigation of 207 alleged dead voters in South Carolina found only five instances unexplained by clerical errors. For instance, sometimes a son with the same name as his dead father was accidentally recorded as voting under the father's name. A study of dead voters in the 2006 Georgia midterm election concluded that only fifteen of the 66 alleged instances of dead voting were potentially fraudulent. All but four of the dead votes were cast absentee, and most of the absentee voters in question cast early ballots but died before the election, giving the impression of voter fraud. A 2013 study testing for additional cases of electoral fraud in addition to two cases that had already been documented found no additional cases of such fraud.

=== Politicization of voter ID issues ===
In 2014, a study released by the Congressional Research Service concluded that, in the absence of systematic risk analyses, it is difficult to determine what points in the election process—voter registration, voting systems, polling place location and hours, poll worker training, voter identification, vote tabulation, or other steps—involve the greatest potential risks to election integrity and therefore warrant the greatest attention. Another 2014 study argued that careful voter roll maintenance is probably a more effective method for preventing voter fraud than voter ID laws.

A 2015 study found that local coverage of voter fraud during the 2012 elections was greatest in presidential swing states and states that passed strict vote ID laws prior to the 2012 election. There was no evidence that the reporting was related to the actual rate of voter fraud in each state. Based on this data, the authors concluded that "parties and campaigns sought to place voter fraud on the political agenda in strategically important states to motivate their voting base ahead of the election". Another 2015 study found a similar correlation between the enactment of voter ID laws and a state's electoral competitiveness, suggesting electioneering motives.

A 2016 study found polarization over voter ID laws was less stark in state legislatures where electoral competition was not intense. The same 2016 study found a notable relationship between the racial composition of a member's district, region, and electoral competition, and the likelihood that a state lawmaker supported a voter ID bill. The study found that "Democratic lawmakers representing substantial black district populations are more opposed to restrictive voter ID laws, whereas Republican legislators with substantial black district populations are more supportive." Southern lawmakers (particularly Democrats) were more opposed to restrictive voter ID legislation. Black legislators in the South were the least supportive of restrictive voter ID bills. A 2018 experimental study in Legislative Studies Quarterly, which sent messages from Latino and white constituents to lawmakers, found that lawmakers who supported voter ID laws were less likely to respond to messages sent by Latino constituents.

A 2017 study in American Politics Research found that the adoption of voter ID laws is most likely when control of the governor's office and state legislature switches to Republicans, and when the size of black and Latino populations in the state increases. Another 2017 study found that the different advertising strategies used to advertise Kansas' voter ID laws by different county clerks influenced the effect of these laws on turnout.

Several states controlled by Democrats maintain voter ID laws. For instance, Hawaii has required a state-issued photo ID for decades. In 2011, the Rhode Island legislature enacted a photo ID requirement, which was signed by governor Lincoln Chafee, making Rhode Island the most recent state controlled by Democrats to pass such legislation. However, both Hawaii and Rhode Island are "non-strict photo ID states", meaning that, in some circumstances, an affidavit or other legal measure can satisfy the ID requirement. In 2021, many Democrats, including Joe Manchin, Stacey Abrams and Raphael Warnock signaled a general openness to voter ID laws in the context of the For the People Act. The Washington Post observed an "evolution" by many Democrats on the issue, some of whom were no longer as strongly opposed to voter ID, and in a few cases, went on record to say they had never really been opposed to it.

== Registration and election day voter ID laws by state ==
State	Original Date Enacted	Type of Law	Key Dates and Notes
Alabama	2014	Photo ID (non-strict)	Law tightened in 2011 to require photo ID as of 2014, but it had not obtained federal preclearance. Following the US Supreme Court ruling in the case of Shelby County v. Holder, (2013), suspending the provision for pre-clearance, the state attorney general believed the voter ID law could be implemented in 2014. The state of Alabama issues free voter ID cards to voters who need them. These photo IDs are issued by driver license bureaus. The state closed driver license bureaus in eight of the ten counties with the highest percentages of nonwhite voters, and in every county in which blacks made up more than 75 percent of registered voters. However, the Board of Registrars' offices were kept open in all counties, and mobile ID locations remain active. Two election officials can sign sworn statements saying they know the voter as an alternative to showing a photo ID.
Alaska		Non Photo ID required (non-strict)	A Photo ID law was drafted by Rep. Bob Lynn; it was referred to the State Affairs and Judiciary Committees on January 7, 2013.
Arizona	2004	Strict Non Photo ID	Non-photographic forms of ID are accepted at polling places as of 2013
Arkansas	2013	Non Photo ID required (non-strict)	Photo ID bill passed by lawmakers in 2013, and survived a veto by the Governor to become Act 595 of 2013. On May 2, 2014, Pulaski County Circuit Judge Tim Fox ruled Act 595 unconstitutional, but stayed his ruling pending an appeal. The week before early voting began for the 2014 midterm elections, the Arkansas Supreme Court affirmed Judge Fox's decision declaring Arkansas Act 595 of 2013 to be unconstitutional on its face.
California		Multiple ID sources accepted, including Photo ID's	In most cases, California voters are not required to show identification before they cast ballots.
Colorado	2003	Non-Photo ID required (non-strict)	Non-photographic forms of ID allowed at polling places as of 2013.
Connecticut		Non Photo ID required (non-strict)	Non-photographic forms of ID allowed at polling places.
Delaware		Non Photo ID required (non-strict)	Non-photographic forms of ID allowed at polling places as of 2013.
Florida	1977	Photo ID (non-strict)	Photo ID required when voting in person.
Georgia	1977	Strict Photo ID	Existing law tightened in 2005 to require a photo ID; in 2006, passed a law providing for the issuance of voter ID cards on request at no cost to registered voters who do not have a driver's license or state-issued ID card. Photo ID was required to vote in the 2012 elections. Photo ID required for absentee voting as of 2021, pending legal challenges.
Hawaii	1978	Photo ID (non-strict)	Photo ID required when voting in person.
Idaho	2010	Photo ID (non-strict)	Voters may sign a Personal Identification Affidavit if they do not possess a Photo ID at the polls. A ballot measure in the 2024 presidential elections was successfully passed which requires the voter to be a US citizen.
Illinois		No ID required	Illinois requires ID (non-strict) for proof of current address when a voter initially registers to vote in a new precinct. No ID is required for a registered voter to cast a ballot.
Indiana	2005	Strict Photo ID	Photo ID required when voting in person, enacted in 2008 after Supreme Court clearance. The Indiana law was upheld by the U.S. Supreme Court in Crawford v. Marion County Election Board.
Iowa	2017	ID required	Iowa voters are required to show a voter ID card, driver's license, non-driver's ID, military/veterans ID, passport, or tribal document at the polls before they vote. A ballot measure in the 2024 presidential elections was successfully passed which requires the voter to be a u.s citizen.
Kansas	2011	Strict Photo ID	Photo ID required for in person voting; registration requires proof of citizenship, i.e., passport, birth certificate. The state suggested that federal registration ID could be used only for federal elections, and voters would need proof of citizenship for local and state elections. In July 2016 a federal court struck this down, and said the state had to allow more forms of ID for voting in November 2016. The Tenth Circuit struct down the requirement of proof of citizenship to register in April 2020.
Kentucky		Non Photo ID required (non-strict)	A citizen may vote if they have Photo ID, or if a precinct officer can vouch for the voter. A ballot measure in the 2024 presidential elections was successfully passed which requires the voter to be a u.s citizen.
Louisiana		Photo ID (non-strict)	Voters may also use non-photographic identification at the polling place.
Maine		No ID required	No ID needed at polling place if registered to vote at least one day prior to election. However an ID is required to vote if person was registered to vote on the day of the election
Maryland	2013	No ID required	Republicans sponsored a House Bill requiring Photo ID in 2013.
Massachusetts		No ID required	Non-photographic ID is accepted at polling stations.
Michigan		Photo ID (non-strict)	Passed in 1996, but ruled invalid until a State Supreme Court ruling in 2007. Voters are requested to show photo ID or sign a statement saying they do not have valid ID in their possession at the time. Either way, the voter will not be turned away.
Minnesota		Multiple ID sources accepted, including Photo ID's	Minnesota registration can be done in advance online or on paper, which requires state drivers license or MN ID numbers (both are photo ID's) or partial Social Security number. Election day registration has been in place in Minnesota since 1974. On election day, previously registered voters must sign their name on the precinct voter list but are not required to provide a photo ID. For voters who register on election day there are seven options to prove identity and residency in the voting precinct, including ID with current name and address (examples use photos), other approved photo ID's, a list of approved documents, another registered voter vouching for address, college ID (normally includes photo), valid registration in same precinct, notice of late registration, staff person of residential facility. Some, mostly urban Minnesota precincts, use computer poll book software that, as an option, can read the bar code of a Minnesota drivers license and quickly match the voter with their electronically stored registration, a feature that speeds up voting. The National Conference of State Legislatures (NCSL) March 2023 update of "Voter ID Laws" misrepresents Minnesota's election rules by labeling them as "No document required to vote". While documentation is not required for voters who have preregistered up to two years prior to and 21 days before election day (and voted in the last four years), a comprehensive list of identity documents (including photo ID's) and alternatives are required to preregister, and the same list applies to voters registering on election day. Minnesota also allows voters to register by checking a box when they apply for or renew their state driver's license or state ID (both are photo ID's).
Mississippi	2011	Strict Photo ID	Governor signed Photo ID bill into law in 2012. The bill was required to go through Pre-Clearance check from the federal government. The US Supreme Court ruling in Shelby v. Holder (2013) suspended this provision. Mississippi was expected to enact its new Photo ID requirement in 2014. Photo ID is now required to vote in 2018.
Missouri	2002	Non-Photo ID required (non-strict)	In 2006, the existing law was tightened to require photo ID. In 2006, State Supreme Court blocks law. In 2013, State House passes Voter ID law, needing approval by both State Senate and voters in November 2014 elections. State House passes an additional version of Photo ID law in 2016. State Senate passes Photo ID law in 2016. Vote held to amend the state constitution in regard to Photo ID requirement in summer of 2016, resulting in Photo ID law being enacted. A ballot measure in the 2024 presidential elections was successfully passed which requires the voter to be a u.s citizen.
Montana	2003	Non-Photo ID required (non-strict)	Montana Voter ID Bill tabled in committee in 2013 by both Republicans and Democrats. Voter impersonation fraud was not substantiated as a problem in the state.
Nebraska		Photo Id and other options	Online, mail in, Department of Motor Vehicles in-office and personal messenger/agent voter registration must be completed by third Friday prior to election. In person at local County Clerk's office by 2nd Friday prior. Registration requires a copy of a current and valid photo ID, or a copy of a utility bill, bank statement, government check, paycheck or other government document which is dated within 60 days immediately prior to the date of presentation showing the same name and residence address provided on the voter registration application.
Nevada	2024	Strict Photo ID	Secretary of State sponsored a bill for Photo ID in 2012. A ballot measure in the 2024 presidential elections was successfully passed which requires the voter to present photo identification when voting in person or to provide the last four digits of their driver's license or Social Security number when voting by mail.
New Hampshire	2015	Photo ID (non-strict)	Voters may sign an affidavit and have their photograph taken in lieu of showing a photo ID. (Voters who object to having their photo taken for religious reasons may sign an additional religious affidavit in lieu of the photograph.)
New Jersey		No ID required	Non-photographic forms of ID are accepted at the polls.
New Mexico	2008	No ID required	In 2008, the existing voter ID law was relaxed, and now allows a voter to satisfy the ID requirement by stating his/her name, address as registered, and year of birth.
New York		No ID required	Non-photographic ID accepted at polling stations
North Carolina	2018	Photo ID (strict)	In 2013, the state House passed a bill that requires voters to show a photo ID issued by North Carolina, a passport, or a military identification card when they go to the polls by 2016. Out-of-state drivers licenses are accepted only if the voter registered within 90 days of the election, and university photo identification is never acceptable. In July 2016, a three-judge panel of the United States Court of Appeals for the Fourth Circuit reversed a trial court decision in a number of consolidated actions and struck down the law's photo ID requirement, finding that the new voting provisions targeted African Americans "with almost surgical precision," and that the legislators had acted with clear "discriminatory intent" in enacting strict election rules, shaping the rules based on data they received about African-American registration and voting patterns. The U.S. Supreme Court let this decision stand without review in May 2017. In response, the General Assembly proposed, and the voters passed, a voter ID requirement in the state constitution. Enabling legislation is set to take effect in 2020. A judge temporarily blocked the law on December 27, 2019. Democratic Attorney General Josh Stein has decided to appeal. The General Assembly, through the joint action of North Carolina's Speaker of the House and President pro tempore of the Senate, have filed for an emergency stay. A ballot measure in the 2024 presidential elections was successfully passed which requires the voter to be a u.s citizen.
North Dakota	2003	Strict Non-Photo ID	ND Senate passes bill that would require Photo identification OR a person with Photo ID to vouch for a voter without ID. 2003 law amended in 2013, and moved to a strict non-photo requirement. On August 1, 2016, a federal judge blocked the law, citing "undisputed evidence … that Native Americans face substantial and disproportionate burdens in obtaining each form of ID deemed acceptable". Specifically, the state had said that tribal cards without street addresses of the resident were unacceptable, but many Native Americans use post office boxes and do not have street addresses on reservations. The state revised the law in April 2017. The law was again put on hold by the district court in April 2018. This decision was appealed to the Eighth Circuit Court of Appeals and on July 31, 2019, the law was upheld.
Ohio	2006	Strict Photo ID	Non-photographic forms of ID are accepted at polling stations. With strong Republican majorities in Ohio House and Senate, the Photo ID bill was expected to be revisited following the ruling in Shelby v. Holder (2013). The legislature rescinded the practice of a "Golden Week," during which voters could both register and vote early. In July 2016 the court ruled that this change put an undue burden on African-American voters, as the state had not proved justification through documented instances of fraud. Ohio House Bill 458, enacting a strict photo ID requirement and limitations on mail-in voting and in-person early voting was signed into law by Gov. Mike DeWine on January 6, 2023. The law requires voters to present a photo ID in order to cast their ballots. Furthermore, the ID requirement also applies to voter registration.
Oklahoma	2009	Non-Photo ID required (non-strict)	Oklahoma voters approved a voter Photo ID proposal proposed by the Legislature in 2010. The only non-photo form of ID accepted at the polls is the voter's registration card. A ballot measure in the 2024 presidential elections was successfully passed which requires the voter to be a u.s citizen.
Oregon		Mail Ballots Only	Oregon has no polling stations, and ballots are mailed in. Non-photographic forms of ID are accepted for voting registration. Ballot envelopes must be signed and signatures are compared to voter registration card.
Pennsylvania		No ID required	Law struck down by Commonwealth Court Judge Bernard L. McGinley on January 17, 2014, as "violative of the constitutional rights of state voters" after first full evidentiary trial since Shelby County v. Holder (2013). The law was found, by preponderance of evidence, to place undue burden on hundreds of thousands of already registered voters due to a lack of infrastructure and state support for obtaining required IDs.
Rhode Island	2014	Photo ID (non-strict)	RI requires Photo ID at the polls in 2014.
South Carolina	1988	Photo ID (non-strict)	Law tightened in 2011. U.S. Justice Department rejected South Carolina's law as placing an undue burden disproportionately on minority voters. On October 10, 2012, the U.S. District Court upheld South Carolina's Voter ID law, though the law did not take effect until 2013. As of January 2016, a photo ID is requested, but a voter registration card will be accepted if there is a "reasonable impediment" in possessing a photo ID. A ballot measure in the 2024 presidential elections was successfully passed which requires the voter to be a u.s citizen.
South Dakota	2003	Photo ID (non-strict)	If a voter does not possess a photo ID at the polling place, then the voter may complete an affidavit of personal identification.
Tennessee	2011	Strict Photo ID	Law tightened in 2011. Tennessee voters were required to show Photo ID during the 2012 elections.
Texas	1990	Photo ID (non-strict)	Law tightened in 2011. U.S. Justice Department rejected the Texas law as placing an undue burden disproportionately on minority voters. The 2013 US Supreme Court ruling in Shelby County v. Holder (2013) suspended the provision for pre-clearance absent an updated model. On October 9, 2014, a U.S. District Judge struck down the law. On October 14, 2014, a panel for the 5th Circuit Court of Appeals issued a preliminary injunction against the ruling of the District Court, which was confirmed 6–3 by the U.S. Supreme Court on October 18; it sent the law back to the lower courts. Therefore, the state will implement this law for the 2014 elections. On August 5, 2015, the 5th Circuit Court of Appeals found the law to violate Section 2 of the Voting Rights Act and sent it back to the U.S. District Court. In July 2016, the 5th Circuit Court of Appeals found the law discriminatory against minorities and ordered the lower court to come up with a fix before the November 2016 elections. In February 2017, U.S. Attorney General Jeff Sessions dropped the lawsuit against the 2011 voter ID legislation.
Utah	2009	Non-Photo ID required (non-strict)	Non-photographic forms of ID are accepted at polling stations.
Vermont		No ID required	No ID required to vote at polling stations.
Virginia	2020	No photo ID required	Lawmakers passed a Voter ID bill in 2010, and the then Governor implemented it in a way that allows non-photo IDs. After the 2012 election, the Virginia legislature passed a new law stipulating that non-photo IDs cannot be used. The governor signed a law to require photo IDs in 2013. (Acceptable forms of voter ID include a permit for a concealed handgun but not a Social Security card or utility bill.) The law would have needed to pass "pre-clearance" by the U.S. Department of Justice under the 1965 Voting Rights Act (certain states and jurisdictions, mostly in Southern states were required to wait for pre-clearance before changing voting laws). The US Supreme Court ruling in the case of Shelby County v. Holder, (2013), suspended the provision for pre-clearance, clearing the way for Virginia to enact the new Photo ID requirement in 2014. Governor Northam signed legislation repealing the photo ID requirement on April 12, 2020.
Washington	2005	Non-Photo ID required (non-strict)	Washington has no polling stations. Ballots are mailed in.
West Virginia	2017	Photo ID (non-strict)	Republicans were preparing a Photo ID bill in 2013. West Virginia required a non-photo ID to vote beginning in 2017. A photo ID was required to be presented in order to vote beginning in 2025 after a law was signed by Governor Patrick Morrisey.
Wisconsin	2011	Strict Photo ID	Following two 2012 rulings by Dane County circuit judges that blocked implementation of the 2011 Wisconsin Act 23 law requiring Voter ID, on July 31, 2014, the Wisconsin Supreme Court upheld the law. On September 12, the Seventh Circuit Court of Appeals allowed the law to be put into effect 54 days before the 2014 elections, overturning a previous ruling in federal court. On October 9, 2014, the state was barred from implementing the Voter ID law for 2014 by the U.S. Supreme Court. On March 23, 2015, the United States Supreme Court rejected an appeal by the ACLU against Wisconsin's voter ID law, effectively upholding the Seventh Circuit's ruling that it is constitutional. The law went into effect with the local/state primary vote on February 16, 2016. The case was remanded back to Judge Adelman of the federal Eastern District of Wisconsin for further proceedings. He gathered evidence as to the burden of the law. In July 2016 he issued an injunction against the voter ID law, "ruling citizens without an official ID may still cast ballots after signing an affidavit affirming their identity." This ruling was appealed to the Seventh Circuit and subsequently put on hold in August 2016. Oral arguments were held in February 2017. A decision is still pending. A ballot measure in the 2024 presidential elections was successfully passed which requires the voter to be a u.s citizen.
Wyoming	2021	Strict Non Photo ID	Acceptable identification includes a Wyoming driver's license, a U.S. passport, or a Medicaid or Medicare insurance card.
Washington, D.C.		No ID required	No ID needed at polling stations.

== See also ==
Voter identification laws
