= Vincent Pons =

French economist and entrepreneur

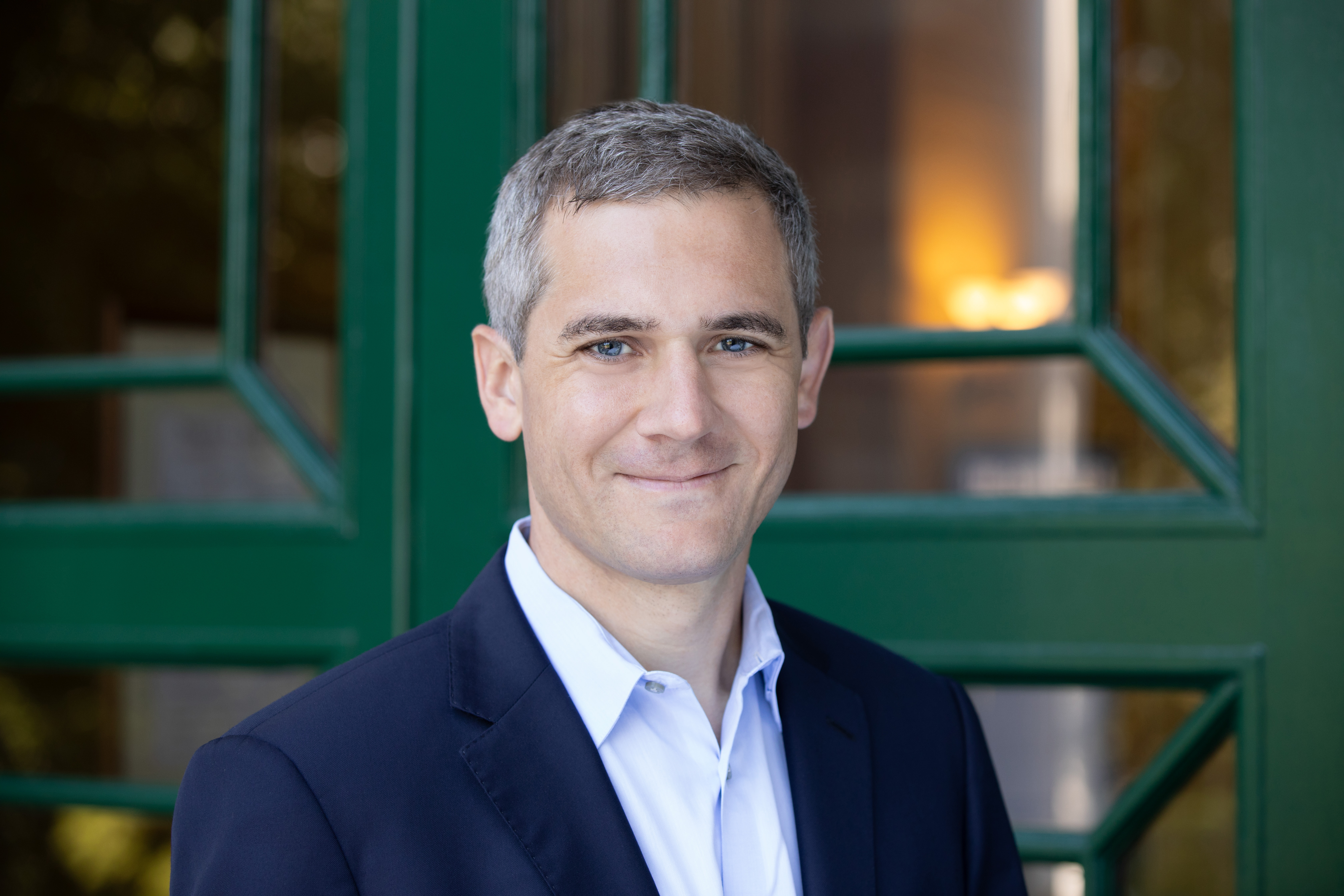
- Born: 30 November 1983 (age 42); Le Chesnay, France
- Known for: Research on Democracy

Academic background
- Education: Massachusetts Institute of Technology (PhD); Paris School of Economics (MS); ENSAE (MS); Ecole Normale Supérieure (MS); Sorbonne University (MS)
- Doctoral advisor: Esther Duflo; Benjamin Olken

Academic work
- Discipline: Political economy, Development economics
- Institutions: Harvard University
- Awards: Best Young French Economist Award, 2023
- Website: Information at IDEAS / RePEc

Vincent Pons (born 30 November 1983) is a French economist who is the Michael B. Kim Associate Professor of Business Administration at Harvard Business School. Pons's research focuses on questions in political economy and development economics.

== Early life and education ==
Born in 1983, Pons spent most of his schooling and higher education in France. After completing his secondary education in Alsace, he was admitted at École normale supérieure (Paris) in 2003.

He obtained his Master's degree in Political philosophy from Sorbonne University in 2005, his Masters in International Economics from Sciences Po in 2006 and his Master of Economics from ENSAE Paris and Paris School of Economics in 2006.

Pons moved to Boston to pursue his Doctor of Philosophy in 2008 and received his Ph.D. in economics from the Massachusetts Institute of Technology in 2014 under the direction of Esther Duflo and Benjamin Olken.

== Career ==
Pons became interested in voter mobilization during Barack Obama 2008 presidential campaign.

In 2012, he was invited to serve in 2012 François Hollande presidential campaign for President of France. As national director of Hollande’s field operation, he designed, implemented, and managed the largest campaigning effort in Europe’s political history. This campaign, coordinated with Guillaume Liegey and Arthur Muller, is described in their book Porte à porte: Reconquérir la démocratie sur le terrain.

Since 2015, Pons has been employed at Harvard Business School. He served as an assistant professor between 2015 and 2020, an associate professor between 2020 and 2024, and has been a full professor since 2024. He is affiliated with the National Bureau of Economic Research, Center for Economic and Policy Research and Abdul Latif Jameel Poverty Action Lab.

== Research ==
Pons' research concerns political economy – in particular the foundations of democracy: how democratic systems function, and how they can be improved.

In “Will a Five-Minute Discussion Change Your Mind?” Pons has evaluated 2012 François Hollande presidential campaign, showing that the door-to-door visits significantly contributed to Hollande's victory. In subsequent work, Pons has assessed the overall effects of all campaign information and of all contextual factors on voters’ behavior.

Pons has examined the effects of Voter identification laws in the United States and voter registration barriers on electoral participation and on voter fraud.

He has shown that many voters value voting expressively over voting strategically for the front-runner they dislike the least to ensure her victory.

Together with Laurent Bouton, Julia Cagé and Edgard Dewitte, Pons has studied the rise of small campaign contributions in the U.S.

== Entrepreneurship ==
Pons is a partner of the company Liegey Muller Pons, later renamed eXplain, which he cofounded in 2013 with Guillaume Liegey and Arthur Muller. After 2013, eXplain worked on 1,500 electoral campaigns, including the presidential campaign of Emmanuel Macron during the 2017 French presidential election. Since 2018, the company has provided AI tools to companies in contact with local governments. In 2023, the company raised six million euros.

== In media ==
Pons has written articles for Harvard Business Review and for French newspapers including Le Monde and Les Echos. He has been a columnist for L'Express and Les Echos.

== Awards and recognition ==
- Susan and Paul M. Sniderman Best Experimental Paper in Europe Award (2019)
- Nominated for Best Young French Economist Award, 2021
- American Economic Journal: Applied Economics Excellence in Reviewing Award (2021)
- Journal of the European Economic Association Excellence in Refereeing Award (2021)
- American Economic Review: Insights Excellence in Refereeing Award (2021)
- Poets&Quants Best 40-Under-40 MBA Professors (2022)
- Best Young French Economist Award, 2023
- 2024 Young Leader of the French-American Foundation

== Selected bibliography ==
1. How do Campaigns Shape Vote Choice? Multicountry Evidence from 62 Elections and 56 TV Debates (with Caroline Le Pennec), Quarterly Journal of Economics, 138(2), pp. 703–767, May 2023
2. Does Context Outweigh Individual Characteristics in Driving Voting Behavior? Evidence from Relocations Within the U.S. (with Enrico Cantoni), American Economic Review, 112(4), pp. 1226–1272, April 2022
3. Strict ID Laws Don't Stop Voters: Evidence from a U.S. Nationwide Panel, 2008–2018 (with Enrico Cantoni), Quarterly Journal of Economics, 136(4), pp. 2615–2660, November 2021
4. Expressive Voting and Its Cost: Evidence from Runoffs with Two or Three Candidates (with Clémence Tricaud), Econometrica, 86(5), pp. 1621–1649, September 2018
5. Will a Five-Minute Discussion Change Your Mind? A Countrywide Experiment on Voter Choice in France, American Economic Review, 108(6), pp. 1322–1363, June 2018
6. Happiness on Tap: Piped Water Adoption in Urban Morocco (with Florencia Devoto, Esther Duflo, Pascaline Dupas, and William Pariente), American Economic Journal: Economic Policy, 4(4), pp. 68–99, November 2012
