= Robin Hood tax =

Package of financial transaction taxes

The Robin Hood Tax (UK-based campaigning group)
- Founded: 2010
- Purpose: Political lobbying, marshaling grassroots support.
- Location(s): United Kingdom and international
- Region served: International
- Method: New media, social networking and creative marketing
- Website: The Robin Hood Tax

The Robin Hood tax is a package of financial transaction taxes (FTT) proposed by a campaigning group of civil society non-governmental organizations (NGOs). Campaigners have suggested the tax could be implemented globally, regionally, or unilaterally by individual nations. Conceptually similar to the Tobin tax (which was proposed for foreign currency exchange only), it would affect a wider range of asset classes including the purchase and sale of bonds, commodities, mutual funds, stocks, unit-trusts, and derivatives such as futures and options.

A United Kingdom-based global campaign for the Robin Hood tax was launched on 10 February 2010, and is being run by a coalition of over 50 charities and organisations, including Christian Aid, Comic Relief and UNICEF. The UK government published a response favouring instead bank levies and a financial activities tax, citing the International Monetary Fund's report to the June 2010 G20 meeting, "A Fair and Substantial Contribution by the Financial Sector". The Robin Hood tax campaign also supports both a Bank levy and a Financial Activity Tax, saying they are agnostic about the chosen mechanism providing it involves a sizeable transfer of wealth from the financial sector to the needy. However most of their campaigning efforts have focussed on the FTT variant.

By autumn 2011, the Robin Hood campaign had gained considerable extra momentum and support from prominent opinion formers, with a proposal from the European Commission to implement an FTT tax at EU level set to enter the legislative pipeline. The proposal, supported by eleven EU member states, was approved in the European Parliament in December 2012, and by the Council of the European Union in January 2013.

The formal agreement on the details of the EU FTT still need to be decided upon and approved by the European Parliament. In June 2023, the European Commission stated that "the prospects of reaching an agreement" on the FTT in the future were "limited", adding there was "little expectation that any proposal would be agreed in the short term".

== Early history of the terminology ==
Robin Hood is an English folk hero said to have stolen from the rich to give to the poor. Redistributive taxes have thus long been called Robin Hood taxes. In 2001, the charity War on Want released The Robin Hood Tax, an earlier proposal presenting their case for a currency transaction tax. In 2008, Italian treasury minister Giulio Tremonti introduced a windfall tax on the profits of energy companies. Tremonti called the tax a "Robin Hood Tax" as it was aimed at the wealthy with revenue to be used for the benefit of poorer citizens, though unlike the tax campaigned for in 2010 it was neither a transaction tax nor global nor aimed at banks.

== The 2010 UK campaign ==
The campaign has proposed to set taxes on a range of financial transactions – the rate would vary but would average at about 0.05%. The tax would be applied to those trading in financial products such as stocks, bonds, currencies, commodities, futures, and options. It would affect individual investors, banks, hedge funds and other financial institutions. The campaign is sponsored by various charities, aiming to raise money for International development, to tackle climate change and to protect public services. The amount of money raised would depend on a number of factors, including how many countries agree to the tax and the rate.

It has been proposed by the campaigning (lobbying) group that the money raised from this tax be split between domestic use and international aid. In an article co-authored by one of the campaign's most prominent advocates, Comic Relief founder Richard Curtis, it was suggested that approximately 50% of funds raised would be assigned to domestic use to protect public services and for governments to tackle poverty at home. Under the proposal, international efforts to reduce global poverty would receive another 25%, and the remaining 25% would go towards helping low income countries mitigate the effects of climate change and to reduce their own emissions.

The British campaign's launch was accompanied by an online poll on the charity's web site for the public to have a say on whether they support the tax. Initially, there was an apparent backlash with what appeared to be thousands of members of the public visiting the Robin Hood Tax to vote against the idea. However, on investigation it was claimed by the lobbying group that some five thousand of the "no" votes came from only two servers, one of them belonging to the investment bank Goldman Sachs.

The Robin Hood tax has been supported by some 350 economists in a letter written to the G20, including Joseph Stiglitz and Jeffery Sachs. Politicians supporting the tax include Angela Merkel, Nicolas Sarkozy and Katsuya Okada, Japan's foreign minister. According to a press release by the lobbying organisation, support has been forthcoming from the financial sector by prominent figures including George Soros, Warren Buffett and Lord Turner, chairman of the UK's Financial Services Authority. At 5 February 2010 G7 meeting in Canada consensus was formed for some form of tax charged against large banks to cover the cost to government of insuring banks against future crisis. G7 officials planned to seek approval from other G20 nations at the June 2010 summit before progressing towards implementation.

While the movement supporting this or similar transaction taxes is international, the use of the "Robin Hood" theme has been especially prominent in the United Kingdom. An early thrust of the 2010 campaign involved grass roots supporters being encouraged to lobby MPs and the British Treasury for an implementation of the Robin Hood tax to be announced unilaterally as part of the UK's 24 March 2010 Budget. The British Chancellor refused to implement a Robin Hood tax, saying it would need to be co-ordinated internationally or else it would result in thousands of jobs being lost in the UK. Another theatre for the campaign is the European Parliament, where in March 2010 a resolution was passed calling for progress to be made in identifying ways to set up a "Robin Hood" type tax.

== Efforts in 2011 and later ==
Campaigning for the tax continued in 2011, with over 1000 economists signing a letter addressed to G20 finance ministers prior to their April 2011 meeting in Washington. Prominent signatories include Jeffery Sachs; Nobel prize winners Joseph Stiglitz and Paul Krugman; Harvard's Dani Rodrik and Cambridge's Ha-Joon Chang. A copy of the letter was also sent to Bill Gates, who has been commissioned by G20 chair and French president Nicolas Sarkozy to investigate new ways of funding the development of low income countries. The Guardian reported that staff from the Gates Foundation are also involved in international lobbying at G20 capitals.

The Robin Hood campaign has been attempting to build international public enthusiasm for the tax prior to the November G20 summit; in June 2011 the organisation reported the staging of campaigning events in 43 countries. In late June the European Commission reversed its earlier opposition to the tax, proposing EU financial transaction tax be adopted within all member states of the European Union. Moves to pass the proposal through the legislative process are scheduled to commence in autumn 2011. A European version of the tax is projected to raise up to €30bn a year. ECB president Jean-Claude Trichet warned that implementing the tax could hurt Europe unless it could be rolled out globally. In August 2011 Sarkozy and German Chancellor Angela Merkel affirmed their support for the proposed European implementation. Great Britain's prime minister David Cameron remains opposed to the tax unless it can be implemented globally, meaning that a European implementation would likely have to be confined to the Eurozone not the whole EU.

As part of his September State of the Union speech, President of the European Commission José Manuel Barroso officially proposed an upgraded package of transaction taxes for adoption by the EU, now projected to raise up to €55bn ($75bn) per year. Also in September, Bill Gates presented his preliminary findings to the 2011 IMF & World Bank meeting in support of the Robin Hood tax. Gates's proposal is for a set of taxes which could raise between $48–250bn per year. Unlike Barroso's proposal, Gates is advocating the tax be adopted on a G20 wide bases rather than for just the EU, and Gate's plan is geared more towards raising funds for aid and development rather than for regular public spending and repairing government finances. Various British business, banks and economists such as Howard Davies have attacked the EU proposal saying it would be bad for growth and would harm the economy. Max Lawson for the Robin Hood campaign responded to developments by saying "Game on!".

In October, Adbusters, the organisation responsible for sparking the Occupy movement, called for a global march in support of the Robin Hood tax, to take place on 29 October just before the 2011 G20 leaders summit. Marches did not occur in all "occupied" cities, but events involving several hundred protesters did take place at locations including Washington DC, Vancouver and Edinburgh. Also in October, the Robin Hood tax was endorsed by Pope Benedict XVI. In November, Rowan Williams, then Archbishop of Canterbury, re-affirmed his support of the Robin Hood campaign with an article in the Financial Times, saying the Vatican's strong backing for a FTT was "probably the most far-reaching" of their recent statements on reforming the International monetary system.

In November, Bill Gates presented his report to the 2011 G-20 Cannes summit, saying that a FTT tax could be an effective way to raise funds to tackle poverty in the developing world. However, Gates also told the Financial Times that an FTT was only one option among many, admitting that in his opinion it was less important than tobacco and fuel taxes. At the G20 Summit, there was strong support for the Robin Hood tax from Germany and France but opposition from other members including the US, Canada and Australia.

A few days after the G20 Summit, European finance leaders debated the possible introduction of a regional FTT tax. Again there was strong support from Germany and France but also from Austria, Belgium, Greece, Finland, Luxembourg, Spain, Portugal, while strong opposition comes from Britain, Sweden, Denmark, the Czech Republic, Romania and Bulgaria, with some members being sceptical especially about the value of implementing an FTT without including at least all 27 EU states. As European Union members remain divided over the issue, advocates of the FTT have said it could be implemented only within the eurozone, excluding countries like Sweden and the United Kingdom. France's president Hollande had committed to a Robin Hood tax in his 2012 election campaign. In a meeting just prior to the 2012 G8 summit he advised that he intends to uphold his commitment, though David Cameron repeated that Britain would veto the tax if attempts were made to impose it across the EU. Plans were made in France to implement the tax unilaterally, though these were superseded by an agreement to launch a Robin Hood tax at EU level. Eleven countries including France and Germany will take part, with the tax due to go live in 2014.

== European Union financial transaction tax ==
EU Financial transaction tax Supporting EU countries Opposing EU countries Undecided Euro countries Undecided non-Euro countries

The EU financial transaction tax (EU FTT) is a proposal made by the European Commission in September 2011 to introduce a financial transaction tax within the 27 member states of the European Union by 2014. The tax would only impact financial transactions between financial institutions charging 0.1% against the exchange of shares and bonds and 0.01% across derivative contracts. According to the European Commission it could raise €57 billion every year, of which around €10bn (£8.4bn) would go to Great Britain, which hosts Europe's biggest financial center. It is unclear whether a financial transaction tax is compatible with European law.

If implemented the tax must be paid in the European country where the financial operator is established. This "R plus I" (residence plus issuance) solution means the EU-FTT would cover all transactions that involve a single European firm, no matter if these transactions are carried out in the EU or elsewhere in the world. The scheme makes it impossible for say French or German banks to avoid the tax by moving their transactions offshore, unless they give up all their European customers.

Being faced with stiff resistance from some non-eurozone EU countries, particularly United Kingdom and Sweden, a group of eleven states began pursuing the idea of utilising enhanced co-operation to implement the tax in states which wish to participate. The proposal supported by the eleven EU member states, was approved in the European Parliament in December 2012, and by the Council of the European Union in January 2013. By June 2023 it was agreed by the Commission that there was little prospect of formal agreement of a potential implementation of an EU wide FTT.

== United States financial transaction tax proposals ==
Revenue estimate for US financial transaction tax
Tax base	Tax rate	Revenue estimate (US$ billion)
US stocks/equities	.5%	108–217
US bonds	.02%	26–52
US forex spot	.01%	8–16
US futures	.02%	7–14
US options	.5%	4–8
US swaps	.015%	23–46
US total		177–354

Different US financial transaction tax (US FTT) bills have been proposed in Congress since 2009. The main differences between the proposals has been the size of the tax, which financial transactions are taxed and how the new tax revenue is spent. The bills have proposed a .025%–.5% tax on stocks, .025%–.1% tax on bonds and .005%–.02% on derivatives with the funds going to health, public services, debt reduction, infrastructure and job creation. The House of Representatives has introduced since 2009 ten different US FTT related bills and the Senate has introduced four. The bills in the Senate have been variously sponsored by Tom Harkin (D-Iowa) or Bernie Sanders (I-Vermont). The bills in the House have been variously sponsored by Peter DeFazio (D-Oregon), John Conyers (D-Michigan) or a number of other Representatives.

The US FTT bills proposed by Rep. Peter DeFazio (D-Oregon) and Sen. Harkin (D-Iowa) have received a number of cosponsors in the Senate and House. The Let Wall Street Pay for the Restoration of Main Street Bill is an early version of their cosponsored US FTT bill which includes a tax on US financial market securities transactions. The bill suggests to tax stock transactions at a rate of 0.25%. The tax on futures contracts to buy or sell a specified commodity of standardised quality at a certain date in the future, at a market determined price would be 0.02%. Swaps between two firms and credit default swaps would be taxed 0.02%.

The tax would only target speculators, since the tax would be refunded to average investors, pension funds and health savings accounts. Projected annual revenue is $150 billion per year, half of which would go towards deficit reduction and half of which would go towards job promotion activities. The day the bill was introduced, it had the support of 25 of DeFazio's House colleagues.

in 2012, Representative Keith Ellison introduced the new version of the U.S. Robin Hood Tax Campaign, which promises to raise up to $350 billion in annual revenues that would be used to revitalise Main Street Communities across America.The legislation embodies the Robin Hood Tax, a 0.5% tax on the trading of stocks, 50 cents on every $100 of trades, and lesser rates on trading in bonds, derivatives and currencies.

== Comparison with the Tobin tax ==
As of November 2011, the term "Tobin tax" is often used as a synonym for the Robin Hood tax. The Robin Hood FTT variant is similar to the original Tobin tax proposal but would apply to a broader set of financial sector transactions. Tobin suggested a form of currency transaction tax. This is a type of financial transaction tax, which taxes specific types of currency transaction. This term has been most commonly associated with the financial sector, as opposed to consumption taxes paid by consumers. Another difference between the Robin Hood FTT and the Tobin tax is that the Tobin tax was intended primarily to stabilise the economic market rather than generate revenue. Economists and analysts are now divided as to whether a small transaction tax would have a significant braking effect on the velocity of trades. According to the campaigning organisation, the Robin Hood Tax campaign presents the raising of revenue for domestic use and to fund international aid as a leading aim.

== Evaluation and reception of the Robin Hood tax ==
Despite the early support for the FTT variant by leading statesmen such as Gordon Brown, by March 2010 the Financial Times had reported the international consensus now favoured a straightforward levy against various bank assets rather than a financial transaction tax. After the June 2010 G20 meeting of finance ministers in Busan, the G20 were no longer agreed even for the less radical global bank levy, with opposition led by Canada and Australia. Officials from EU, USA and UK said they were still planning to implement levies on their own banks, although the tax would likely be at a lower rate now to limit the risk of banks moving to jurisdictions that aren't planning on implementing the levy.

Following on from the Pusan meeting but prior to the main 2010 G-20 Toronto summit, the European Union president Herman Van Rompuy announced that the EU had a common position in favour of both a Robin Hood style transaction tax and a bank levy which they would push for at the G20 gathering. However, according to the Canadian Embassy Newspaper there were divisions within the EU with some member countries such as the Czech Republic against any form of bank tax. No consensus for the tax emerged from the 2010 G20 summit. Prior to the 2011 G20 Summit in November, the Robin Hood campaign had become even more prominent, though it also provoked dozens of critical articles. Again it failed to achieve consensus at the 2011 summit.

=== General criticism ===
The proposed FTT could reduce the total volume traded in financial products, with negative consequences for employment. While this may reduce employment in brokerages and other areas of the securities industry, a further consequence could be unemployment outside of the financial sector. Schwabish (2005) examined the potential effects of introducing a stock transaction (or "transfer") tax in a single city (New York) on employment not only in the securities industry, but also in the supporting industries. A financial transactions tax could lead to job losses also in non-financial sectors of the economy through the so-called multiplier effect forwarding in a magnified form any taxes imposed on Wall Street employees through their reduced demand to their suppliers and supporting industries. The author estimated the ratios of financial- to non-financial job losses of between 10:1 to 10:4, that is "a 10 percent decrease in securities industry employment would depress employment in the retail, services, and restaurant sectors by more than 1 percent; in the business services sector by about 4 percent; and in total private jobs by about 1 percent."

Other unintended consequences of an FTT could include a reduction in professional market participants such as market makers who stand ready to buy or sell at prevailing prices. This could impact the orderly and efficient operation of markets, including the price discovery process. It has been suggested that such reforms could lead to reduced liquidity, wider bid / offer spreads, and greater volatility. According to the United States Chamber of Commerce, the tax could double the cost of certain financial transactions and could cause the Dow Jones Industrial Average to fall by 12.5%.

Mike Devereux, director of the Centre for Business Taxation at Oxford University, has argued the tax would effectively be a stealth tax as the banks would pass all costs on to their customers, with no guaranteed transparency about who exactly would bear the costs. Economics writer Tim Worstall has made similar arguments, stating the tax would ultimately be paid not by the banks but by ordinary consumers and workers. Worstall also argues that overall an FTT tax would reduce tax revenue, so would fail to help provide extra money for helping the poor. By May 2013, with the EU due to launch a Robin Hood tax in 2014, there has been considerable caution expressed from commentators within nations due to implement the tax, such as Germany. For example, Jens Weidmann, president of the Bundesbank, warned that in its current form the tax would harm Europe's repo market, with knock on effects to the real economy as some firms would likely find themselves less able to borrow.

=== Criticism against implementation at national or regional level only ===
If implemented just at EU level rather than globally, critics have stated the negative consequences would be felt disproportionately in Britain, with economists such as Tim Congdon estimating an FTT could result in over 100,000 job losses from London's financial sector. Andrew Tyrie, Chairman of the UK Treasury Select Committee, has listed 17 problems with the FTT tax, including a loss of overall tax revenue for Britain. Critics have conceded that the FTT would reduce the overall volume of transactions, especially those originating from High-frequency trading, but deny that it would reduce the risk of further crises in the financial sector. On 15 April 1990, the tax on fixed-income securities was abolished. It is notable that the tax imposed an increased cost on government borrowing, and this may have influenced the decision to repeal the tax.

== Public opinion ==
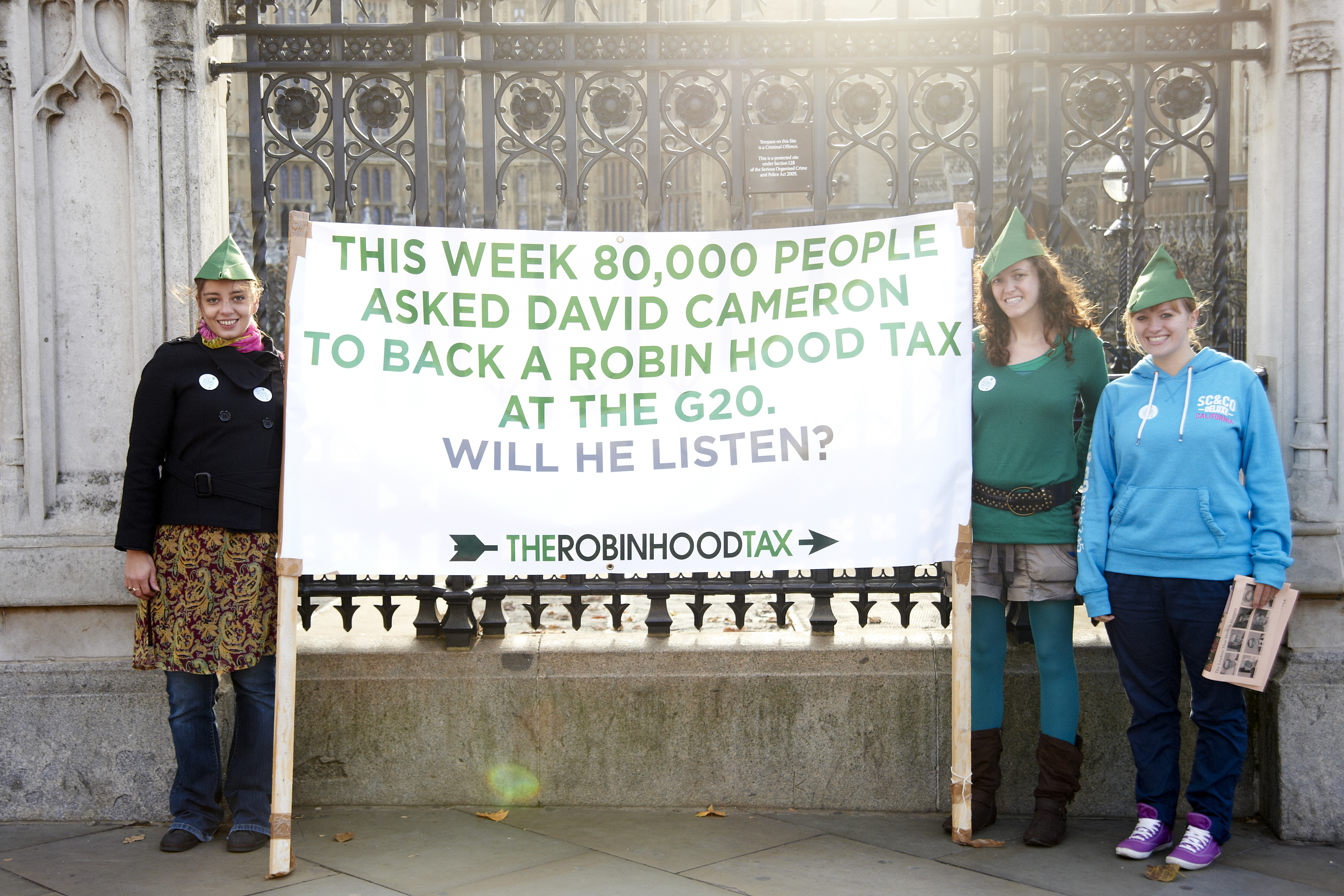
Supporters of a Robin Hood tax outside the Houses of Parliament in November 2011

A Eurobarometer poll of more than 27,000 people published in January 2011 found that Europeans were strongly in favour of a financial transaction tax by a margin of 61 to 26 per cent. Of those, more than 80 per cent agreed that if global agreement cannot be reached – an FTT should, initially, be implemented in just the EU. Support for an FTT, in the UK, was 65 per cent. Another survey published earlier by YouGov suggested that more than four out of five people in the UK, France, Germany, Spain and Italy thought the financial sector has a responsibility to help repair the damage caused by the economic crisis. The poll also indicated strong support for an FTT among supporters of all the three main UK political parties. Despite the arguments that an EU only FTT tax would hurt Great Britain, other polls in 2011 suggested about two-thirds of the British public supported the Robin Hood tax campaign.

== See also ==
- Association for the Taxation of Financial Transactions and for Citizens' Action
- Robin Hood effect
- Spahn tax
- Transfer tax
