= 2012 François Hollande presidential campaign =

Successful French presidential campaign

François Hollande 2012
- Campaign: 2012 Presidential Election (won); 2011 Socialist Primaries (won)
- Candidate: François Hollande
- Affiliation: Socialist Party Radical Party of the Left
- Headquarters: 59, avenue de Ségur, 75 007 Paris
- Key people: Pierre Moscovici (Manager); Stéphane Le Foll; Jean-Marc Ayrault; Michel Sapin; Manuel Valls
- Slogan(s): "Le changement, c'est maintenant" ("Change is now")

Website
- Francoishollande.fr

President of the General Council of Corrèze and former First Secretary of the French Socialist Party François Hollande launched his campaign in March 2011 to become the Socialist and Radical Left Party candidate for the 2012 French presidential election and announced that he would be contesting the presidential primary. Hollande made the announcement that he was running for President following his re-election as a department executive. On 16 October 2011 he won the Socialist and Radical Left Party nomination with more than 56% of the votes over First Secretary Martine Aubry, following a long campaign. On 22 April he topped the ballot in the first round of voting in the presidential election, and on 6 May he defeated the incumbent Nicolas Sarkozy in the second round run-off, becoming the new President of France.

== History ==
=== 2007 nomination ===
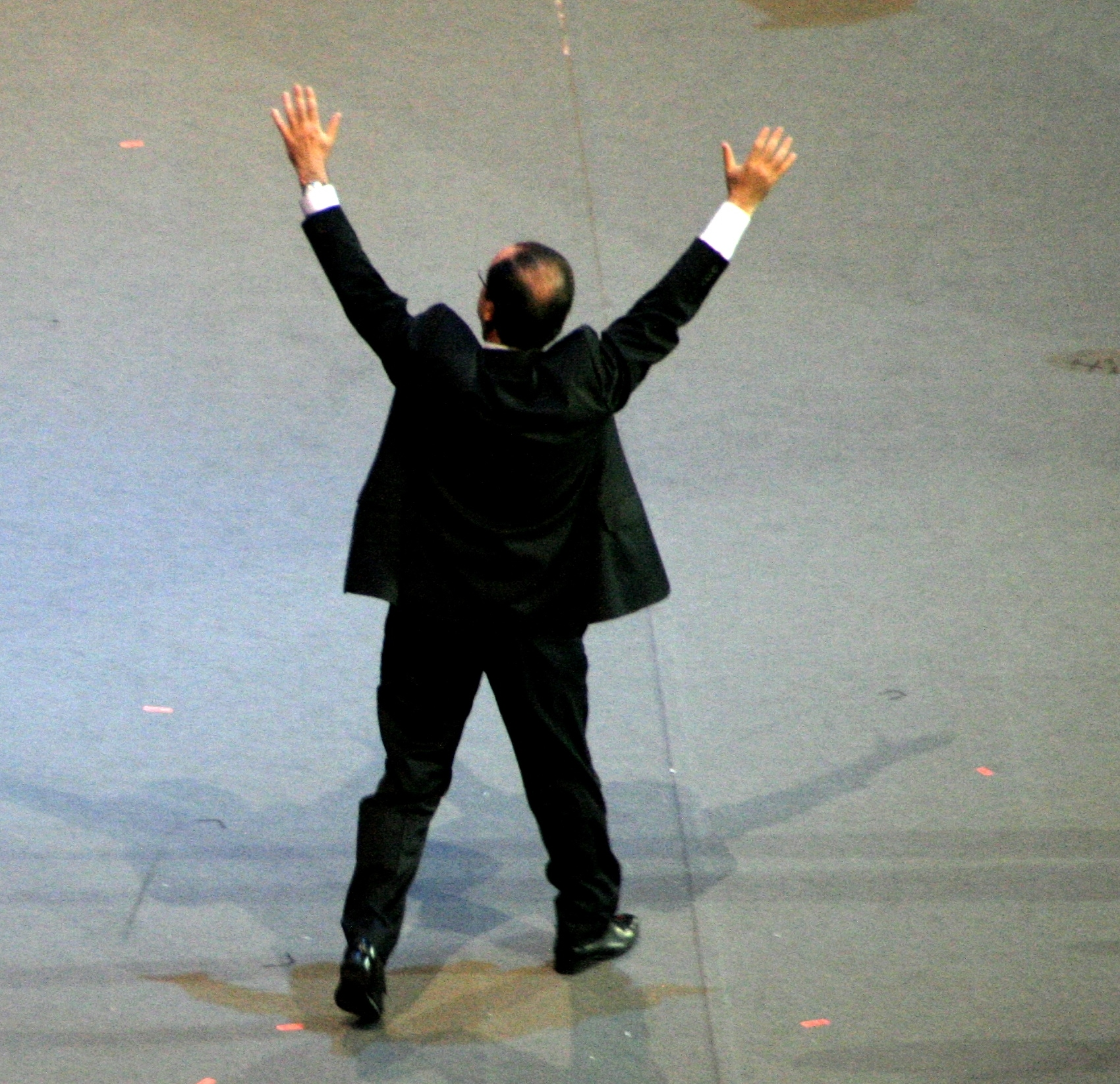
Hollande arriving at a campaign rally

As the First Secretary of the Socialist Party François Hollande first openly considered running for the 2007 presidential election. Capitalizing on her popularity Ségolène Royal, his partner of 30 years and the mother of their four children was to take him the nomination. They had separated in 2006 and announced it publicly after the 2007 election.

=== Resignation as leader of the Socialist Party ===
Following Ségolène Royal's loss in the 2007 presidential election the defeat of the Socialists in the following legislative elections put the Socialist Party in disarray. Hollande announced that he would not seek another term as First Secretary of the party. He publicly declared his support for Bertrand Delanoë, the Mayor of Paris, although it was Martine Aubry who would go on to win the race to succeed him in 2008.

=== Early stages ===
Hollande began his pre campaign in Lorient on 27 June 2009. Without personal announcement it was the first of many speech where he would polish his image as a credible alternative to both Nicolas Sarkozy and the others socialist front figures, mainly Dominique Strauss-Kahn, Martine Aubry and Ségolène Royal.

=== Announcement ===
François Hollande announced on 31 March 2011 that he will run for his party's nomination in the 2012 presidential race.

=== Primary ===
In Socialist primary, Hollande won 39.17 percent of the votes followed by Martine Aubry, the party’s current leader who secured 30.42 percent. He won run-off stage of the primary with a 56.57% score over first secretary who received 43.43% of votes.

=== Headquarters ===
The campaign is based in Paris in 7th arrondissement. The building of 1,000 square meters is leased 40,000 euros per month.

== Political platform ==
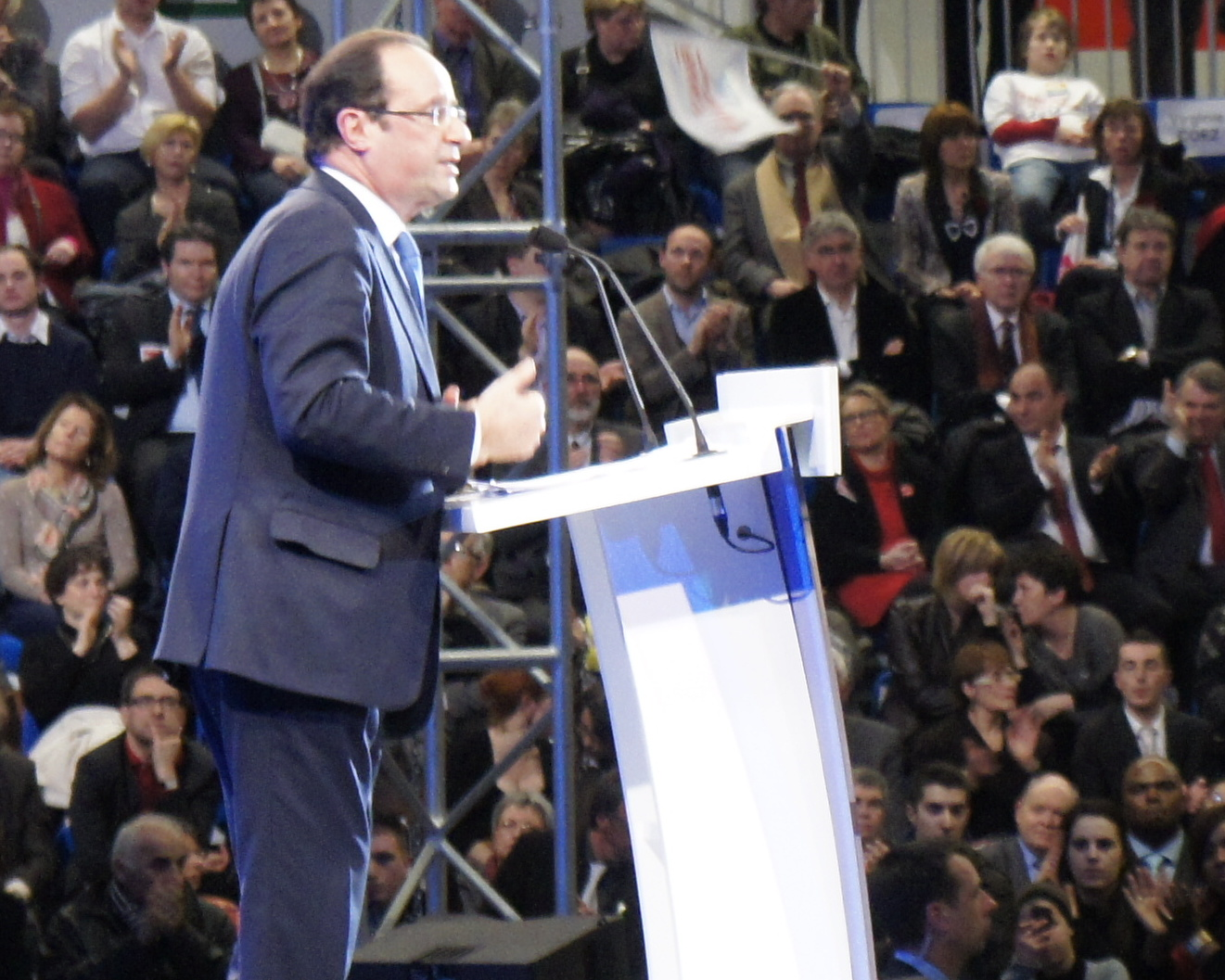
Hollande speaking at a campaign rally

- Regarding foreign policy, he supports the withdrawal of French troops present in Afghanistan by the end of 2012.
- In terms of European politics, he aims to conclude a new contract of Franco-German partnership and he advocates the adoption of a Directive on the protection of public services. Proposes closer Franco-German partnership: "an acceleration of the establishment of a Franco-German civic service, the creation of a Franco-German research office, the creation of a Franco-German industrial fund to finance common competitiveness clusters (transport, energy or environment) and the establishment of a common military headquarters."
- With regard to the financial system, he backs the creation of a European rating agency, the separation of lending and investment in banks, and the implementation of the Robin Hood tax.
- Concerning energy, he endorses reducing the share of nuclear power in electricity generation from 75 to 50% in favor of renewable energy sources.
- Regarding taxation, he supports the merger of income tax and the General Social Contribution (CSG), the creation of an additional 45% for additional income of 150 000 euros, capping tax loopholes at a maximum of €10,000 per year, and questioning the relief ISF measure that should bring €29 billion in additional revenue.
- On the integration of young people, the recruitment of 60 000 teachers, creating a study allowance and training means-tested, setting up a contract that would allow generation of an experienced employee to be the guardian of a young hired in exchange for exemptions from, creating a total of 150,000 subsidized jobs.
- Aid to SME's, with the creation of a public bank investment-oriented SME's and reducing the corporate tax rate to 30% for medium corporations and 15% for small.
- Recruitment of 5 000 judges, police officers and gendarmes.
- Construction of 500 000 homes per year, including 150 000 social, funded by a doubling of the ceiling of the A passbook, the State making available its local government land within five years.
- Restoration of retirement at age 60 for those who have contributed more than 41 years.
- Hollande supported same-sex marriage and adoption for LGBT couples, he’ll be pushing the issue in early 2013.
- The provision of development funds for deprived suburbs.
- Return to a deficit of 0% of GDP in 2017.
- Favours ratifying the European Charter for Regional or Minority Languages, for the recognition of regional languages of France: Alsatian, Lorraine Franconian, French Flemish, Catalan, Corsican, Breton, Gallo, Basque, Langues d'oïl, Franco-Provençal and Occitan.
- Wants to "combine the positions of presidents of the European Commission and of the European Council (currently held by José Manuel Barroso and Herman van Rompuy respectively) into a single office and that it should be directly chosen" by the Members of the European Parliament.

== Potential Prime Ministers ==
Leader of the Socialist Group in the National Assembly Jean-Marc Ayrault, MP and former minister Michel Sapin, campaign manager Pierre Moscovici and Party Secretary Martine Aubry are favorites to be selected as Prime Minister of France if Hollande win. A poll showed that 50% of people believed Aubry should be given the job, followed by Moscovici on 17%, Laurent Fabius on 11%, Jean-Marc Ayrault on 10% and Sapin on 9%. In the final days leading up to the Presidential election, two individuals were left on Hollande's final list for Prime Minister: Jean-Marc Ayrault and Martine Aubry.

== Polls ==
When he entered his candidacy he was very low in polls, but after the Dominique Strauss-Kahn sexual assault case Hollande was propelled to head of the polls for the remainder of the primary. Boosted by his victory, Hollande was constantly in mind in the first round and widely the projected winner against President Nicolas Sarkozy in a hypothetical runoff.

== Endorsements ==
Actors, singers and humorists

- Gérard Darmon, Yannick Noah, Jane Birkin, Jacques Higelin, Michel Piccoli, Pierre Arditi, Denis Podalydès, Jamel Debbouze, Benjamin Biolay, Bénabar, Joyce Jonathan, Jean Benguigui, Gérald Dahan, Geneviève de Fontenay

Politicians (across party lines support)

- Jacques Chirac, Former President of the French Republic
- Ségolène Royal, President of the Regional Council of Poitou-Charentes, Socialist Party candidate for the 2007 French presidential election, and former partner of Hollande
- Brigitte Girardin, General Secretary of United Republic and Former Minister
- Jean-Jacques Aillagon, Former Minister
- Corinne Lepage, Former Minister and Presidential candidate
- Fadela Amara, Former Secretary of State of Nicolas Sarkozy
- Martin Hirsch, Former High Commissioner of Nicolas Sarkozy
- Azouz Begag, Former Deputy Minister

== See also ==
- French Socialist Party presidential primary, 2011
- 2012 French presidential election
