= Justin Levitt =

American constitutional law scholar

Justin Levitt is an American constitutional law scholar and professor at Loyola Law School. In September 2015, he left Loyola Law School to become the Deputy Assistant Attorney General in the United States Department of Justice Civil Rights Division. He returned to the faculty of Loyola in early 2017. He then returned to government from 2021-2022, serving as the first Senior Policy Advisor for Democracy and Voting Rights under the Biden Administration before returning once again to the Loyola faculty.

== Education ==
Levitt received his BA magna cum laude from Harvard College and his MPA and JD from Harvard University.

== Career ==
Levitt served as the National Voter Protection Counsel in 2008. He began teaching at Loyola Law School in 2010, where he originally focused on electoral redistricting and administration. While there, he directed the school's Practitioner Moot Program, which allowed new attorneys to practice their arguments. He has also served as a law clerk to Stephen Reinhardt, a judge from the U.S. Court of Appeals for the Ninth Circuit, as well as on advisory committee for the voting system InkaVote. On September 10, 2015, Loyola Law School announced that Levitt would go on leave from their school to join the Department of Justice's Civil Rights Division as their Deputy Assistant Attorney General. He is expected to return to Loyola in early 2017. After he had been appointed to this position, he said that the Department of Justice is hampered by the Supreme Court's 2013 Shelby County v. Holder decision, and that this decision is unquestionably "the biggest change since the last presidential election."

== Work on election law ==
Levitt is an academic researcher on election and constitutional law. In 2014, he reported on Wonkblog that there had only been 31 credible cases of voter impersonation from 2000 to August 2014, out of more than 1 billion ballots cast during this period. He also runs a blog about redistricting. Levitt has also authored work in coordination with the Brennan Center for Justice.

In 2021, he was hired by the Biden Administration as an adviser to strengthen voting rights. He served until 2022.

== Honors and awards ==
Levitt received Loyola's Excellence in Teaching Award for 2013-14.
