= Lorraine Minnite =

American political scientist

Lorraine Carol Minnite
- Education: Boston University, CUNY Graduate Center
- Awards: 2013 Jay Sigler Award for Teaching Excellence from Rutgers
- Scientific career
- Fields: Political science, public policy
- Workplaces: Rutgers University–Camden
- Thesis: Identity, Voting Rights and the Remapping of Political Representation in New York City (2000)

Lorraine Carol Minnite is a professor of political science, as well as an associate professor of public policy, at Rutgers University-Camden.

== Education ==
Minnite received her bachelor's degree in history from Boston University, and her masters' and PhD degrees in political science from the Graduate Center of the City University of New York.

== Career ==
Prior to joining the faculty of Rutgers, Minnite taught at New York University and Barnard College, served as Associate Director of the Center for Urban Research and Policy at Columbia University, and as Research Director for the nonprofit voting rights organization Project Vote.

== Work ==
Minnite's research focuses on issues in American politics, including social justice, political conflict, and institutional change. She has also written two books on election law and racial and class politics in the United States. In a 2009 study co-authored with Robert Erikson, she found inconsistent and weak evidence that voter ID laws reduced turnout. She has argued in her 2010 book, The Myth of Voter Fraud, that voter impersonation is very rare in the United States—in fact, when researching the subject while writing the book, she identified only one case of voter impersonation from 2000 to 2005, involving a teenager in New Hampshire who voted as his father. In the same book, she found that in 2005, the federal government charged far more people with violating migratory bird laws than with committing voter fraud.

== Views ==
Minnite has argued that with respect to voter ID laws, "the costs are very high and the benefits are practically non-existent," and that it does not make sense for illegal immigrants to commit voter fraud because, according to her, "People who are here who are undocumented don't tend to go around trying to, you know, bring attention to themselves, especially doing something that is illegal." She has testified against voter ID laws in Pennsylvania and North Carolina.
