= President of the Departmental Council of Corrèze =

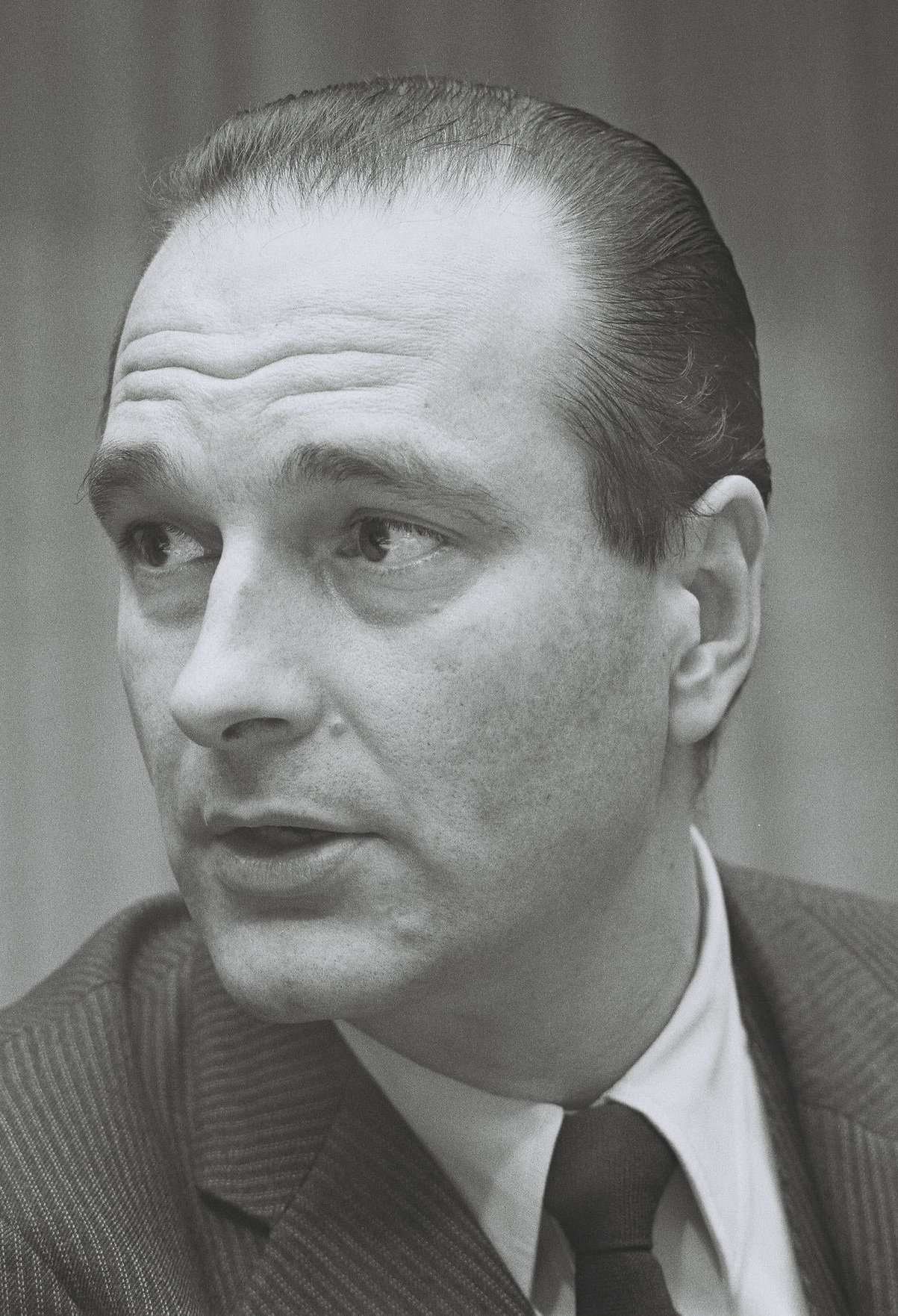
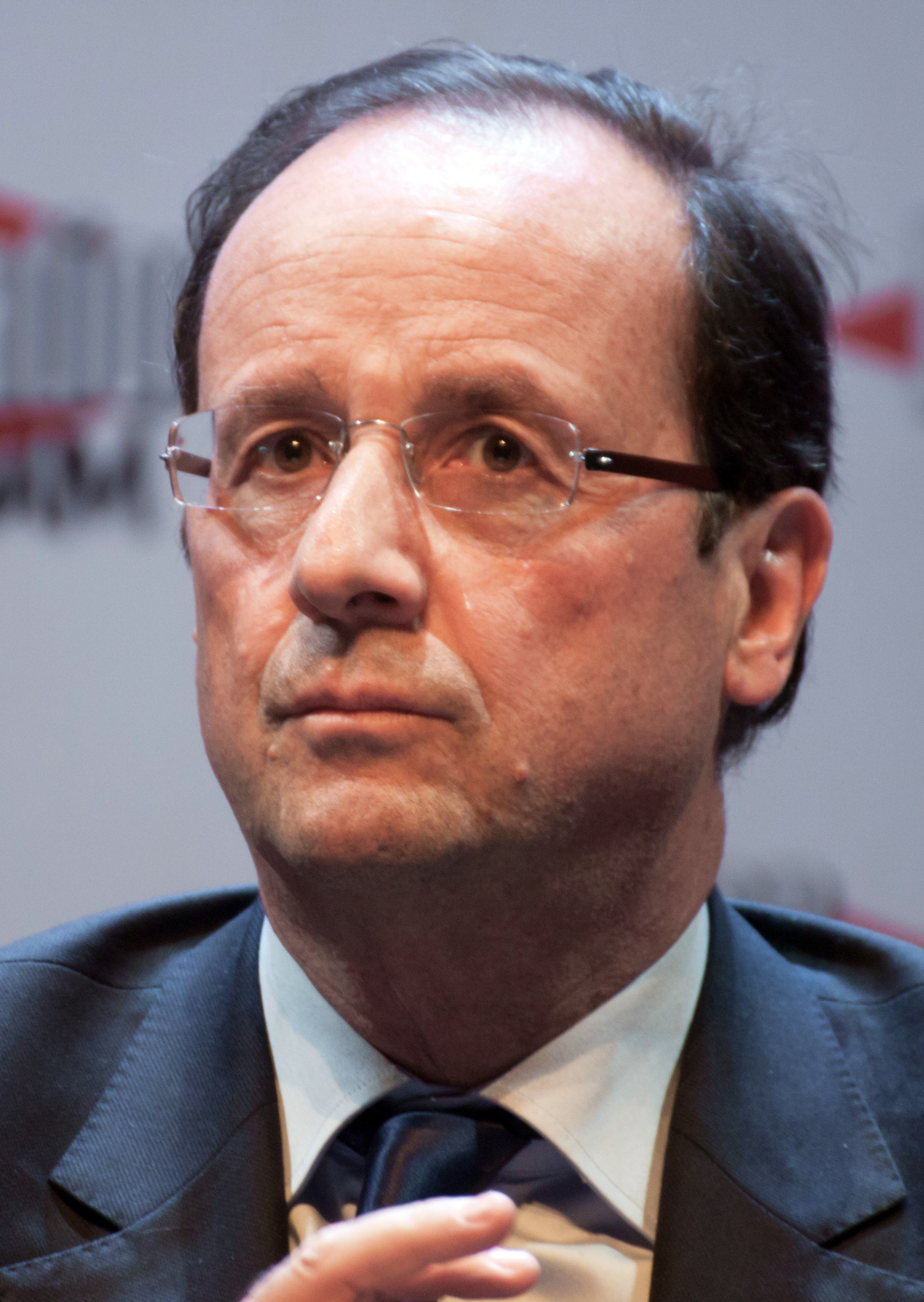
The gaullist Jacques Chirac (left) and the socialist François Hollande (right) both held the position, respectively from 1970 to 1979 and from 2008 to 2012. They both went on to serve as President of France, respectively from 1995 to 2007 and from 2012 to 2017.

The president of the Departmental Council of Corrèze (French: Président du conseil départemental de la Corrèze), until 2015 the president of the General Council of Corrèze (Président du conseil général de la Corrèze), prepares and supervises the spending of the budget and the decisions voted by the departmental councillors. The officeholder, who is in charge of financial management and heads the department's administration, has been Midi Corrézien's Pascal Coste of The Republicans since 2015.

== Tasks and duties ==
The president has numerous functions: convening and chairing meetings, preparing and carrying out deliberations, signing conventions and acting as legal representative of the institution. If necessary, the president can delegate some of his functions to his vice presidents. The President of the Corrèze Departmental Council is assisted by seven vice presidents entrusted with different missions. Together they form the Bureau, which decides the main outlines of department policy and ensures their implementation.

== List of officeholders ==
President	Party	Took office	Left office
Félix Lestang	PCF	1945	1946
Élie Rouby	SFIO, PS	1946	1970
Jacques Chirac	UDR, RPR	1970	1979
Georges Debat	DVD	1979	1982
Armand Boucheteil	PCF	1982	1985
Charles Ceyrac	RPR	1985	1992
Jean-Pierre Dupont	RPR, UMP	1992	2008
François Hollande	PS	2008	2012
Gérard Bonnet	PS	2012	2015
Pascal Coste	UMP, LR	2015	Incumbent

== See also ==
- Departmental Council of Corrèze
- List of presidents of departmental councils (France)
