= Robin Hood effect =

Economic occurrence

The Robin Hood effect is an economic occurrence where income is redistributed so that economic inequality is reduced. That is a redistribution of economic resources due to which the economically disadvantaged gain at the expense of the economically advantaged. The effect is named after the English folkloric figure Robin Hood, who is said to have stolen from the rich to give to the poor.

The Robin Hood effect should not be mistaken for the Robinhood effect, which refers to the increasing significance and attention of small retail investors using trading platforms like Robinhood, characterized by their accessibility and low entry barriers.

== Causes ==
A Robin Hood effect can be caused by a large number of different policies or economic decisions, not all of which are specifically aimed at reducing inequality. This article lists only some of these.

=== Psychology ===
One study done in 2007 by the University of California, Davis suggests that human behaviour tends to a preference for equality, and thus the Robin Hood effect overall. James Fowler, one of the co-authors of the study, remarked that "...people will sacrifice their own money for equality." A survey done after the study indicated that the primary causes were anger and annoyance.

=== Natural national development ===
A Kuznets curve

Simon Kuznets argued that one major factor behind levels of economic inequality is the stage of economic development of a country. Kuznets described a curve-like relationship between level of income and inequality, as shown. That theory prescribes that countries with very low levels of development will have relatively equal distributions of wealth.

As a country develops, it necessarily acquires more capital, and the owners of this capital will then have more wealth and income, which introduces inequality. However, eventually various possible redistribution mechanisms such as trickle-down economics and social welfare programs will lead to a Robin Hood effect, with wealth redistributed to the poor. Therefore, more developed countries move back to lower levels of inequality.

=== Non-proportional income tax ===
Many countries have an income tax system where the first part of a worker's salary is taxed very little or not at all, while those on higher salaries must pay a higher tax rate on earnings over a certain threshold, known as progressive taxation. This has the effect of the better-off population paying a higher proportion of their salary in tax, effectively subsidising the less-well off, leading to a Robin Hood effect.

Specifically, a progressive tax is a tax by which the tax rate increases as the taxable base amount increases. "Progressive" describes a distribution effect on income or expenditure, referring to the way the rate progresses from low to high, where the average tax rate is less than the marginal tax rate. It can be applied to individual taxes or to a tax system as a whole; a year, multi-year, or lifetime. Progressive taxes attempt to reduce the tax incidence of people with a lower ability-to-pay, as they shift the incidence increasingly to those with a higher ability-to-pay.

=== Cross-subsidisation of mobile telephony ===
In many developing countries, mobile communications networks tend to experience a large network externality, which regulators and operators seek to correct by subsidising subscriptions through increased prices for call termination. That then allows the less-well off in that country to gain access to communications services, often for free (on a prepay tariff). The additional cost is then levied on subscribers who make calls to these new subscribers; the call originators tend to be better-off. Therefore, despite there being no direct transfer of money, there is a strong Robin Hood effect, with the better-off subsidising the less well-off.

=== Counterfeit products ===
Counterfeiting is a typical problem faced by luxury fashion brands, resulting in the loss of hundred billion dollars every year. It can lead to the worsening of the brand reputation and can affect the development of new product. People knowingly buy counterfeits, with the primary intention of saving money, when they cite economical and moral justifications for the unethical behaviour. According to the legend of Robin Hood, he was vindicated because of the moral and financial justifications for his actions. Consequently, consumers seem to demonstrate the Robin hood effect when they purchase counterfeit products.

== Examples from real world ==
Several Nordic countries, including Sweden and Finland, have implemented policies associated with the Robin Hood effect, resulting in some of the lowest levels of income inequality in the world. Through a combination of progressive taxation on higher earners and extensive social welfare programmes, these countries have achieved high standards of living for their populations. The outcomes of these policies are frequently cited as evidence of the potential benefits of such an approach in promoting greater economic fairness and social cohesion.

== Challenges ==
The idea of income redistribution has sparked a myriad of discussions and controversies. Opponents contend that overzealous wealth redistribution measures may hinder economic expansion and innovation by disincentivizing high achievers. They argue that excessively taxing the affluent and redistributing wealth could dampen entrepreneurial spirit and stifle investment, ultimately impeding overall economic growth.

However, proponents of income redistribution argue that reducing inequality is crucial for social stability and justice. They emphasize the importance of ensuring that everyone has access to basic necessities and opportunities for advancement, regardless of their socioeconomic background. Moreover, they assert that addressing economic disparities can lead to a more inclusive and prosperous society in the long run.

Finding the equilibrium between mitigating inequality and fostering economic dynamism poses a challenge for policymakers. Striking a balance requires considering various factors, including the potential impact on incentives, productivity, and overall societal well-being. Policymakers must navigate these complexities to design strategies that promote both fairness and economic growth.

== Robin Hood effect and theories of economic justice ==
The Robin Hood effect aligns with normative economic justice theories, notably those centered on principles of redistribution to uphold fairness. Esteemed philosophers like John Rawls have championed redistributive measures as a pathway to ensuring equity and justice within society. According to these philosophical frameworks, disparities in social and economic status are ethically justifiable only if they serve to uplift the most marginalized segments of society. This concept strongly resonates with the rationale behind the Robin Hood effect, which seeks to rectify imbalances in wealth distribution by prioritizing the welfare of those with the least advantage. By embracing these normative theories, societies can strive towards a more just and equitable socioeconomic landscape, where opportunities and resources are more evenly distributed, fostering greater social cohesion and collective well-being.

== Robin Hood paradox ==
The Robin Hood paradox talks about wealth inequality in different stages of a country's development. Countries with lower development and low level of wealth will have less wealth inequality because of a more fairly equal distribution of wealth. As countries develop, the capital holders tend to benefit more from the growth of a country's economy, and thus increase the wealth divide between them and the ones that do not hold any or very little capital.

== Implications ==
The Robin Hood effect aims to reduce wealth inequality and economic disparity, but it also has multifaceted implications. It is definitely not Pareto efficient, in terms of economic efficiency as it could make higher-income individuals worse off. However, supporters of The Robin Hood effect argue that social benefits, such as increased opportunities for the poorer part of the population or enhancing economic stability, outweigh the inefficiencies.

== See also ==
- Income redistribution
- Distribution of wealth
- Economic inequality
- Federal taxation and spending by state
- Robin Hood
- Robin Hood tax
- Robinhood Markets
- Robin hood index
