= 2011 Wisconsin Act 23 =

Act that created a requirement for voters to show photo identification to cast ballots

100th Wisconsin Legislature
- Long title: An Act relating to: requiring certain identification in order to vote at a polling place or obtain an absentee ballot, verification of the addresses of electors, absentee voting procedure in certain residential care apartment complexes and adult family homes, identification cards issued by the Department of Transportation, creating an identification certificate issued by the Department of Transportation, requiring the exercise of rule-making authority, and providing a penalty.
- Territorial extent: Wisconsin
- Enacted: May 25, 2011
- Signed by: Scott Walker

Legislative history
- Bill title: 2011 Assembly Bill 7
- Introduced by: Representatives Stone, Tauchen, Honadel, J. Ott, Vos, Pridemore, Bernier, LeMahieu, August, Spanbauer, Kramer, Petersen, Ziegelbauer, Kestell, Ripp, Van Roy, Kerkman, Jacque, Litjens, Nass, Kaufert, Strachota, Steineke, Kapenga, Krug, Farrow, Knodl, Kleefisch, Kooyenga, Ballweg, Endsley, Rivard, Thiesfeldt, A. Ott, Petryk, Williams, Severson, Wynn, Knudson, Kuglitsch, Petrowski, Nygren, Meyer, Tiffany, Bies, Knilans, J. Fitzgerald and Klenke
- Introduced: January 27, 2011
- Finally passed both chambers: May 19, 2011
- Status: In force

The 2011 Wisconsin Act 23 is a law enacted by the 100th Wisconsin Legislature which established a requirement for nearly all Wisconsin voters to present approved photo identification before registering to vote or casting a ballot. It was one of many new voter ID laws in the United States enacted after the Republican wave election of 2010. Act 23 was developed by Republican Governor Scott Walker and the Republican controlled Wisconsin Legislature during a walkout by Democratic lawmakers as part of the 2011 Wisconsin protests. The law was the subject of extensive state and federal legal challenges which stretched into 2020, but left the law largely intact.

== Approved forms of identification ==
Section 1 of Act 23 specifies that only the following forms of photo identification are acceptable:

- A Wisconsin driver's license
- An nondriver identification card issued by the Wisconsin Department of Transportation
- Photo identification issued by the United States military
- A United States passport or passport card
- A United States naturalization certificate, issued not more than two years prior to the election
- An unexpired receipt for a Wisconsin driver's license or nondriver identification card (this is given at the Department of Motor Vehicles, as Wisconsin's licenses and identification cards are printed and mailed from an outstate provider in California)
- A tribal identification card issued by a recognized Wisconsin Native American tribe
- An unexpired identification card issued by an accredited Wisconsin college or university with a date of issuance, a date of expiration not later than two years after the date of issuance, the voter's signature, and further provided that the student also present proof of enrollment in said college or university

== Implementation ==
In July 2011, the Associated Press reported that the Scott Walker administration was planning to close some DMV locations that could issue identification under the voter ID law and increase the hours that other DMVs were available. The changes were made to comply with a requirement that every county have a DMV location open at least 20 hours per week. A Democratic legislator said that the closures would occur in primarily Democratic areas, while the expansions would occur in primarily Republican areas. Two weeks later, the plan was replaced with a plan to maintain all existing DMV offices and create four new ones.

In July 2011, the Wisconsin Department of Transportation (DOT) sent an internal memo instructing employees that an applicant for an ID card must pay the $28 fee unless the applicant requests that the ID be issued for free. In September 2011, the DMV began posting signs instructing applicants seeking free "ID cards used for voting" to check the appropriate box on the application form.

As initially implemented, an applicant for an identification card was required to present a birth certificate. The Division of Motor Vehicles maintains form MV3002, which allows identification cards to be issued without a birth certificate. The form is not mentioned in publicly available materials published by the DMV, and a high-ranking DMV official was unfamiliar with the form. In September 2014, a procedure was implemented where applicants could supply birth information that would be verified with the State Vital Records Office for free.

== Legal challenges ==
On December 13, 2011, the American Civil Liberties Union (ACLU) filed the lawsuit Frank v. Walker in the United States District Court for the Eastern District of Wisconsin seeking to block the Act as a violation of the U.S. Constitution. In April 2014, U.S. District Judge Lynn Adelman in Milwaukee issued a permanent injunction against the Act, ruling that the Act was unconstitutional as well as a violation of the Voting Rights Act of 1965. Adelman said that it was not shown that voters without acceptable identification could obtain it under the Act and that the state failed to show evidence of recent voter impersonation fraud. Adelman's ruling marked that first time that a voter ID law had been found to violate Section 2 of the Voting Rights Act. Adelman found a violation of Section 2 on the basis of racial minorities not only being more likely to lack acceptable identification, but also facing additional barriers to acquiring acceptable identification.

In a separate litigation, on July 31, 2014, the Wisconsin Supreme Court rejected a challenge to the Act by giving the Wisconsin Department of Motor Vehicles discretion to waive fees, over dissent by Chief Justice Shirley Abrahamson, and Justices N. Patrick Crooks and Ann Walsh Bradley.

The state appealed to the United States Court of Appeals for the Seventh Circuit and asked for a stay of Judge Adelman's injunction. On September 12, 2014, the same day oral arguments were held, a Seventh Circuit panel stayed Adelman's injunction, allowing the Act to immediately take effect, and Wisconsin officials announced plans to implement the Act for the November 2014 election. Judge Frank H. Easterbrook was joined by Judges Diane S. Sykes and John Daniel Tinder. On October 10, an equally divided circuit voted 5–5 to deny rehearing en banc, over written dissent by Judge Richard Posner.

On October 9, 2014, the Supreme Court of the United States vacated the stay imposed by the Seventh Circuit, and thus temporarily barred the state from implementing the voter id law, due to the proximity of the upcoming general election and the fact that absentee ballots were sent out without any notation that proof of photo identification must be submitted, over written dissent by Justice Samuel Alito, joined by Justices Antonin Scalia and Clarence Thomas.

On March 23, 2015, the Supreme Court denied the plaintiffs' petition for a writ of certiorari.

On October 19, 2015, Judge Adelman, entered the order denying the injunction. However, on April 12, 2016, the Seventh Circuit reversed and remanded, with Judge Easterbrook finding the plaintiffs could now challenge the law as it had been applied individually. On July 19, Judge Adelman found that the state was applying the Act unconstitutionally, ordering the state to allow anyone who makes an affidavit of their eligibility to vote in the November general election.

On July 29, 2016, in a separate trial in the United States District Court for the Western District of Wisconsin in Madison, U.S. District Judge James D. Peterson also found the Act was applied unconstitutionally but ordering more limited oversight. On August 10, 2016, the Seventh Circuit stayed Judge Adelman's injunction, leaving in place Judge Peterson's order.

Judge Peterson held a new hearing after reading news reports in The Nation magazine that the state was ignoring his order. On October 13, 2016, Judge Peterson entered an order expanding his oversight but still not permitting voters to swear eligibility by affidavit. After a long appellate process, Judge Peterson's ruling was reversed by the 7th Circuit Court of Appeals in June 2020.
