= Bernard McGinley =

American lawyer

Bernard L. McGinley

Judge of the Pennsylvania Commonwealth Court
- In office January 3, 1988 – January 31, 2016
- Succeeded by: Joseph M. Cosgrove

Personal details
- Born: January 7, 1946 (age 80) Pittsburgh, Pennsylvania
- Party: Democratic

Military service
- Allegiance: United States
- Branch/service: U.S. Army Reserve, Medical Service Corps,
- Years of service: 1971-76
- Rank: Captain

Bernard L. McGinley (born January 7, 1946) was an American judge who presided over cases in the Pennsylvania Commonwealth Court system.

== Education ==
McGinley attended John Carroll University and the University of Pittsburgh School of Law. He worked as a judicial law clerk for the Allegheny County Court of Common Pleas.

== Career ==
McGinley was an Assistant District Attorney for Allegheny County from 1971 to 1974. He was an instructor of criminal law for the Allegheny County Community College from 1974 to 1975.

From 1975 to 1981, McGinley was engaged in private law practice, and also chaired the Board of Viewers for Allegheny County from 1975 to 1980.

In 1981, McGinley was elected as a judge of the Court of Common Pleas of Allegheny County in 1981. In 1987, he was elected as a judge of the Commonwealth Court of Pennsylvania.

After serving as a member of the Court of Common Pleas for 28 years, McGinley retired in 2016.
