= Departmental Council of Corrèze =

Departmental legislature in France

Departmental Council of Corrèze Conseil départemental de la Corrèze

Leadership
- President: Pascal Coste, LR since 2 April 2015

Structure
- Seats: 38
- Political groups: Government (28): LR (19); DVD (6); MoDem (1); RE (1); UDI (1); Opposition (10): PS (7); DVG (3); www.correze.fr

The Departmental Council of Corrèze (French: Conseil départemental de la Corrèze), formerly the General Council of Corrèze (Conseil général de la Corrèze, until 2015), is the departmental council of Corrèze, Nouvelle-Aquitaine, France. It was presided over by François Hollande from 2008 to 2012, who departed from this position when he took office as the President of France on 15 May 2012. It includes 38 members, known as departmental councillors (conseillers départementaux) or general councillors (conseillers généraux) until 2015.

== Composition ==
The assembly of Departmental Council of Correze is made up of a President, seven vice presidents and thirty departmental councillors with the later two groups representing various cantons of the Correze. Two departmental councillors from each canton are elected for six years by a two-round majority vote.
