= Pascal Coste (politician) =

French politician (born 1966)

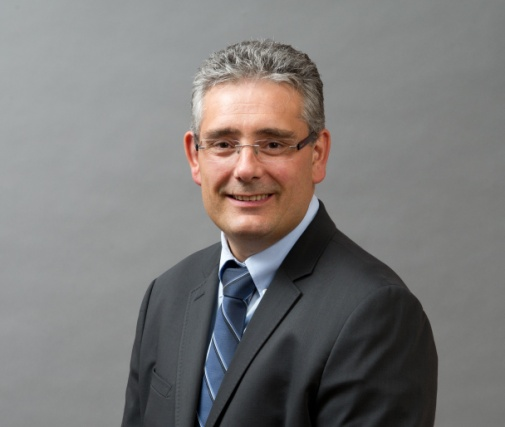
- Coste in 2012

President of the Departmental Council of Corrèze
- Incumbent
- Assumed office 2 April 2015
- Preceded by: Gérard Bonnet

Personal details
- Born: 13 September 1966 (age 59)
- Party: LR (since 2015); TEM (since 2020); NF (since 2022)

Pascal Coste (born 13 September 1966) is a French politician serving as president of the Departmental Council of Corrèze since 2015. He has been a member of the Regional Council of Nouvelle-Aquitaine since 2021.
