= Embassy Newsweekly =

Canadian weekly newspaper

Embassy Newsweekly, also known as Embassy Newspaper and Embassy - Diplomacy This Week, is a Canadian weekly publication focused on foreign policy and international affairs. The publication reports a readership of over 60,000. It is the Wednesday edition of The Hill Times newspaper.

Embassy Newsweekly was launched by Jim and Anne Marie Creskey in 2004. The latter is also the publisher of both Embassy Newsweekly and The Hill Times.
