= Wonkblog =

2011–2019 The Washington Post blog

- Founded: September 2011
- Founder: Ezra Klein
- Website: Wonkblog
- Current status: Defunct

Wonkblog was a blog, hosted by The Washington Post, that was dedicated to domestic policy, economics and politics. It was started by Ezra Klein, originally as a solo venture, but, by February 2013, had grown to employ a staff of five people. The Post originally rebuffed his attempts to persuade them to support Wonkblog.

== History ==
On January 21, 2014, it was announced that Klein would leave Wonkblog, along with two of his colleagues: Melissa Bell and Dylan Matthews. In 2014, Wonkblog hired Matt O'Brien as its lead economic policy writer. Other core writers included Christopher Ingraham and Carolyn Y. Johnson. Wonkblog also featured regular academic contributors including Daniel Drezner and Keith Humphreys. As of February 21, 2017, Wonkblog was edited by Patrick Reis. In 2019, the Post ceased to host Wonkblog and began redirecting traffic to its Economic Policy section instead.
