= Project Vote =

US nonprofit organization

- Formation: 1994
- Type: 501(c)(3) non-profit
- Purpose: Voting rights
- Location: Washington, D.C.
- Website: projectvote.org
- Formerly called: Voting for America

Project Vote (and Voting for America, Inc.) was a national nonpartisan, nonprofit 501(c)(3) organization that worked to mobilize marginalized and under-represented voters until it ceased operations on May 31, 2017. Project Vote's efforts to engage low income and minority voters in the civic process included voting rights litigation and the provision of training, management, evaluation, and technical services. Its last executive director was Michael Slater, who had worked for Project Vote since 2004. In May 2017, the staff announced that Project Vote would suspend operations indefinitely due to difficulties maintaining funding.

== History ==
A national organization known as Project VOTE!, originally a project of Americans for Civic Participation, was active between 1982 and 1993, and after reorganizing formed the foundation of Project Vote. Project VOTE! is best remembered for a highly successful Chicago voter registration drive run by Barack Obama in 1992.

Project Vote in its present form was incorporated in 1994 as Voting for America, Inc., and in 1997 it began registering as Project Vote/Voting for America. In 2010, the organization dropped Voting for America from its registered name.

Between 1994 and 2008, Project Vote often coordinated voter registration campaigns with local chapters of ACORN, and Project Vote's board members also had membership in ACORN before the summer of 2008. Project Vote has also worked with organizations such as Demos, National Voting Rights Institute, Lawyers' Committee for Civil Rights Under Law, Brennan Center for Justice at NYU School of Law, and the Fair Elections Legal Network regarding election administration policy and voting rights, including enforcement of the National Voter Registration Act through research, litigation, and technical assistance.

In February 2012, Voting for America/Project Vote filed a federal lawsuit suit on behalf of organizations dedicated to registering citizens to vote challenging Texas' burdensome restrictions on voter registration drives.
