= Nathaniel Persily =

American legal scholar

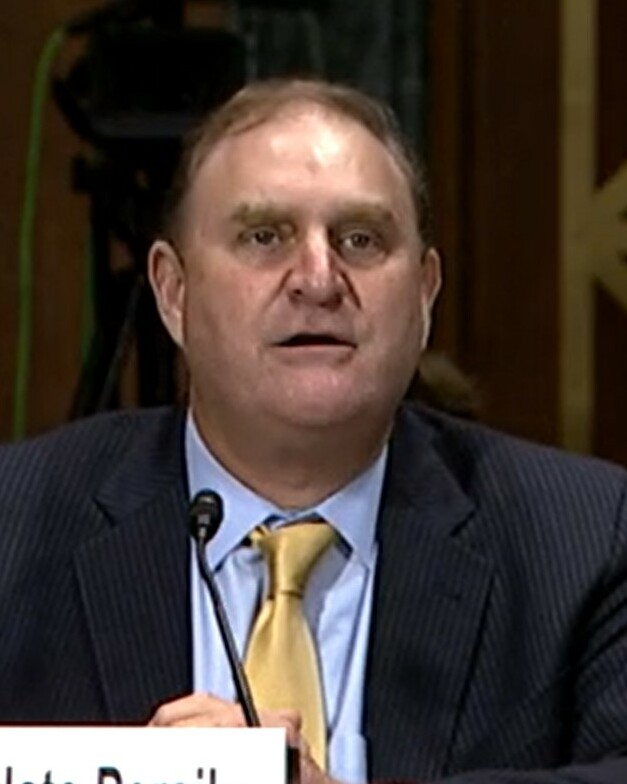
- Persily in 2022
- Education: Yale University (BA, MA); Stanford University (JD); University of California, Berkeley (PhD)
- Website: Official website

Nathaniel Persily is the James B. McClatchy Professor of Law at Stanford Law School, where he has taught since 2013. He is a scholar of constitutional law, election law, and the democratic process.

== Education and early career ==
Persily received his B.A. and M.A. in political science from Yale University in 1992; his J.D. from Stanford Law School in 1998, where he served as president of the Stanford Law Review; and his Ph.D. in political science from the University of California, Berkeley, in 2002. Following law school, Persily clerked for the Honorable David S. Tatel of the U.S. Court of Appeals for the District of Columbia Circuit.

== Career ==
Following his clerkship, Persily worked for two years as associate counsel at the Brennan Center for Justice at the New York University School of Law. Persily then joined the faculty of the University of Pennsylvania Law School, where he was an assistant professor of law from 2001 to 2005 and a professor of law from 2005 to 2007. At the University of Pennsylvania Law School, Persily won the Robert A. Gorman Award for Excellence in Teaching in 2005.

In 2007, Persily moved to Columbia Law School, where he was a professor of law from 2007 to 2008 and the Charles Keller Beekman Professor of Law and Professor of Political Science from 2008 to 2013.

Persily joined the Stanford Law School faculty in 2013. At Stanford, Persily teaches courses on constitutional law, the law of democracy, and the legal regulation of the political process. He also co-teaches an advanced seminar on law and politics with Goodwin Liu, Associate Justice of the California Supreme Court.

Due to his expertise in voting rights, Persily has also served as a court-appointed expert on legislative districting for Georgia, Maryland, and New York, and in 2012, was appointed by the Supreme Court of Connecticut as a special master for redistricting of Connecticut's congressional districts. From 2013 to 2014, Persily served as a Senior Research Director for the Presidential Commission on Election Administration. In 2021, Persily was appointed again as a special master to redraw Connecticut's congressional maps by the Connecticut Supreme Court. In 2022 he was appointed by the New Hampshire Supreme Court to draw districts because the Governor and state legislature failed to agree on a new map.

== Publications ==
Persily is the editor of three books: Public Opinion and Constitutional Controversy (Oxford University Press, 2008), The Health Care Case: The Supreme Court's Decision and Its Implications (Oxford University Press, 2013), and Solutions to Polarization (Cambridge University Press, 2015). He is currently editing a leading casebook on law and democracy (with Samuel Issacharoff, Pamela S. Karlan, and Richard Pildes).

Persily's scholarship has appeared in the Columbia Law Review, the New York University Law Review, the Harvard Law Review, the Southern California Law Review, the Michigan Law Review, the Yale Law Journal, and the Georgetown Law Journal. Persily has also written on election law for The New York Times, The Washington Post, and Politico.

A 2021 study found that between 2016 and 2020, Persily was the sixth most widely cited legal scholar in election law.
