= Mary Johnson Lowe =

American judge

Senior Judge of the United States District Court for the Southern District of New York
- In office July 27, 1991 – February 27, 1999

Judge of the United States District Court for the Southern District of New York
- In office June 27, 1978 – July 27, 1991
- Appointed by: Jimmy Carter
- Preceded by: John M. Cannella
- Succeeded by: Denise Cote

Personal details
- Born: June 10, 1924 New York City, New York, U.S.
- Died: February 27, 1999 (aged 74) Las Vegas, Nevada, U.S.
- Education: Hunter College (BA); Brooklyn Law School (LLB); Columbia Law School (LLM)

Mary Johnson Lowe (June 10, 1924 – February 27, 1999) was a United States district judge of the United States District Court for the Southern District of New York.

== Education and career ==
Born in New York City, Lowe received a Bachelor of Arts degree from Hunter College of the City University of New York in 1951. She received a Bachelor of Laws from Brooklyn Law School in 1954. She received a Master of Laws from Columbia Law School in 1955. She was in private practice of law in New York City from 1955 to 1971. She was a judge of the Criminal Court in New York City from 1971 to 1973. She was an Acting Supreme Court Justice of the New York County Supreme Court from 1973 to 1974. She was a judge of the Bronx County Supreme Court from 1975 to 1976. She was a Justice of the Supreme Court of New York from 1977 to 1978.

=== Federal judicial service ===
Lowe was nominated by President Jimmy Carter on May 10, 1978, to a seat on the United States District Court for the Southern District of New York vacated by Judge John Matthew Cannella. She was confirmed by the United States Senate on June 23, 1978, and received her commission on June 27, 1978. She assumed senior status on July 27, 1991. Her service was terminated on February 27, 1999, due to her death of heart failure in Las Vegas, Nevada.

== Pitts v. Black ==
Lowe presided the legal case Pitts v. Black in 1984. She ruled eligible American voters residing in non-conventional accommodations, like a park bench, cannot be refused to register to vote. As a result, homeless voters were allowed to cast their ballots.

== See also ==
- List of African-American federal judges
- List of African-American jurists

Legal offices
Preceded by John M. Cannella	Judge of the United States District Court for the Southern District of New York; 1978–1991	Succeeded by Denise Cote
