= Irving Kaufman =

American federal judge (1910–1992)

Senior Judge of the United States Court of Appeals for the Second Circuit
- In office July 1, 1987 – February 1, 1992

Chief Judge of the United States Court of Appeals for the Second Circuit
- In office 1973–1980
- Preceded by: Henry Friendly
- Succeeded by: Wilfred Feinberg

Judge of the United States Court of Appeals for the Second Circuit
- In office September 22, 1961 – July 1, 1987
- Appointed by: John F. Kennedy
- Preceded by: Seat established by 63 Stat. 493
- Succeeded by: John M. Walker Jr.

Judge of the United States District Court for the Southern District of New York
- In office October 21, 1949 – September 22, 1961
- Appointed by: Harry S. Truman
- Preceded by: Seat established by 75 Stat. 80
- Succeeded by: John M. Cannella

Personal details
- Born: Irving Robert Kaufman; June 24, 1910 New York City, New York, U.S.
- Died: February 1, 1992 (aged 81) New York City, New York, U.S.
- Education: Fordham University (LLB)
- Known for: Judge in the trial of Julius and Ethel Rosenberg

Irving Robert Kaufman (June 24, 1910 – February 1, 1992) was a United States federal judge, first on the U.S. District Court for the Southern District of New York, and then on the U.S. Court of Appeals for the Second Circuit. Early in his tenure on the District Court, he became nationally known for presiding over the espionage trial of Julius and Ethel Rosenberg, and for sentencing the couple to death. Later in his career, he issued landmark rulings on cases involving the First Amendment, civil rights, and antitrust law. In 1987, he was a recipient of the Presidential Medal of Freedom.

== Early life and education ==
Born to a Jewish family in Brooklyn, New York City, Kaufman received a Bachelor of Laws from Fordham University School of Law in 1931. Although he was Jewish, Kaufman earned the nickname "Pope Kaufman" for his achievement in the required Christian doctrine classes at Fordham, a Catholic school.

== Career ==
After passing the bar exam, Kaufman had a private legal practice in New York City from 1932 to 1935. He then became a Special Assistant United States Attorney of the Southern District of New York from 1935 to 1939, and an Assistant United States Attorney from 1939 to 1940. He returned in 1940 to private practice in New York City. From 1947 to 1948, he served as Special Assistant to the Attorney General of the United States.

=== United States District Court ===
On October 21, 1949, Kaufman received a recess appointment from President Harry S. Truman to the U.S. District Court for the Southern District of New York. It was a new seat created by 63 Stat. 493. He was nominated to the same seat by Truman on January 5, 1950, and confirmed by the U.S. Senate on April 4, 1950.

==== Rosenberg trial ====
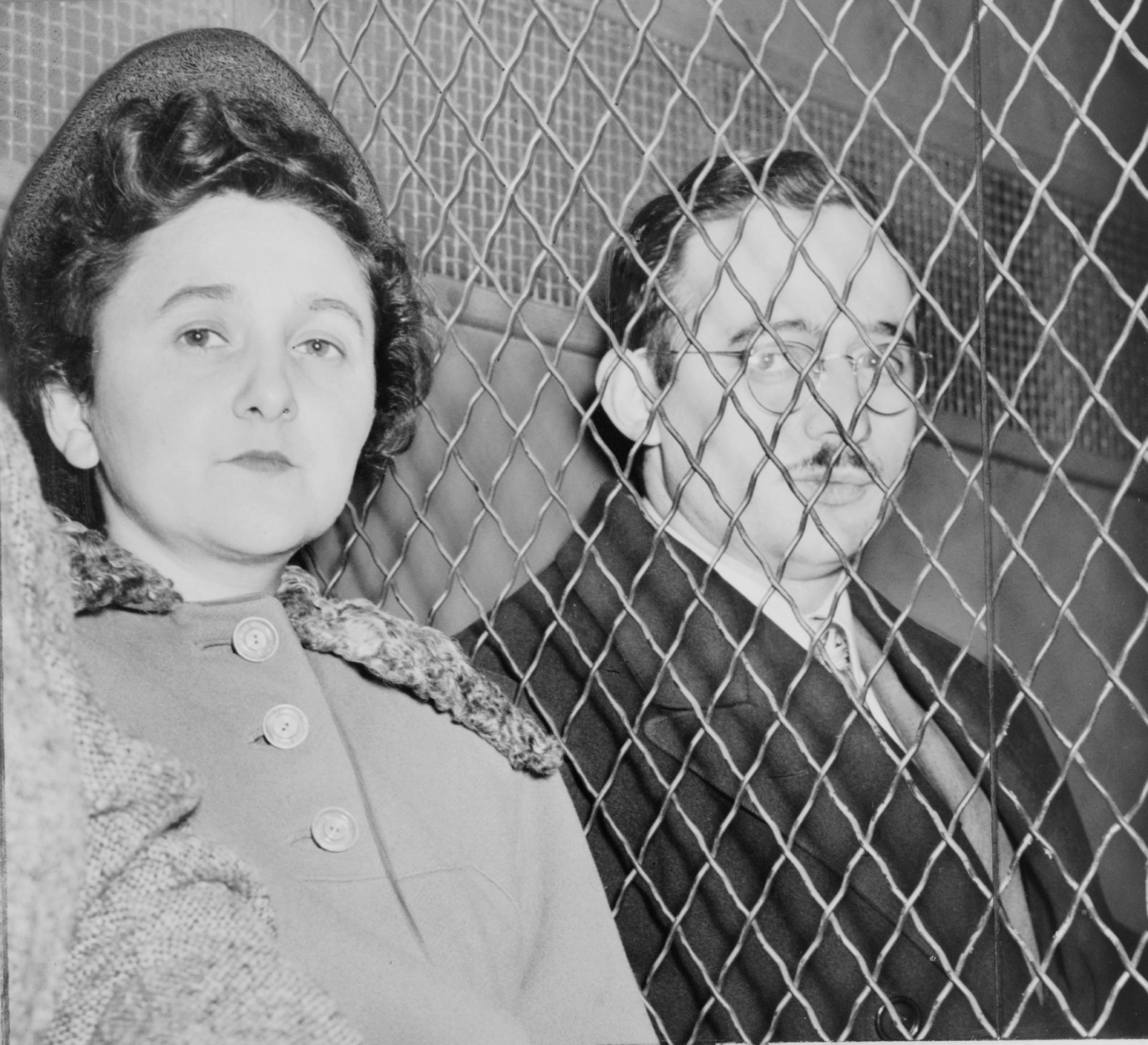
Ethel Rosenberg and Julius Rosenberg (1951)

In March 1951, less than a year into his District Court service, Kaufman presided over the atomic espionage trial of Julius and Ethel Rosenberg, and their co-defendant Morton Sobell. In a controversial decision on April 5, 1951, Kaufman condemned the Rosenbergs to death. It is the trial he is most remembered for. Roy Cohn, one of the trial's prosecutors, wrote in his autobiography that his influence led to Kaufman's being assigned to the case and that Kaufman had imposed the death penalty on Cohn's personal advice. That has not been verified, though it was shown that after Kaufman learned the FBI and Justice Department opposed death penalties in the case, he asked the prosecution to withhold its recommendation before sentencing. At the conclusion of the trial, many considered Kaufman's summing up for the jury highly subjective. In the sentencing hearing, he called the Rosenbergs' crime "worse than murder" and said it had:

already caused, in my opinion, the Communist aggression in Korea, with the resultant casualties exceeding 50,000 and who knows but that millions more of innocent people may pay the price of your treason.

Kaufman said he went to synagogue to pray for guidance before reaching his sentencing decision. This enraged Jewish Supreme Court Justice Felix Frankfurter, who opposed the death penalty. He wrote to Learned Hand, "I despise a judge who feels God told him to impose a death sentence", and also told Hand he was "mean enough" to stay on the Supreme Court long enough to prevent Kaufman from taking Frankfurter's place in the so-called "Jewish seat" on the court.

==== Other notable cases ====
- 1959: Kaufman presided over the jury trial in the federal government's conspiracy case against 21 of the Apalachin meeting delegates. The guilty verdicts of 20 of the men, and the stiff sentences Kaufman meted out, were reversed and invalidated by the Court of Appeals.
- 1961: He was the chief judge in Taylor v. Board of Education of City School District of New Rochelle, which resulted in the North's first court-ordered school desegregation.

=== United States Court of Appeals ===
On September 14, 1961, President John F. Kennedy nominated Kaufman to the U.S. Court of Appeals for the Second Circuit; it was a new seat created by 75 Stat. 80. One week later, Kaufman was confirmed by the U.S. Senate, and he received his commission the next day. He served as the Second Circuit's chief judge from 1973 to 1980. His notable cases included:

- 1964: He wrote the Second Circuit's opinion in Irving Berlin et al. v. E.C. Publications, Inc., a case that helped establish the legal precedent for the right to parody.
- 1966: Kaufman wrote an opinion in the case of United States v. Freeman 357 F.2d 606 (2d Cir. 1966). The judgment overturned the rigid M'Naghten standard for insanity defense and adopted the modern insanity defense described in Section 4.01 of Model Penal Code developed by the American Law Institute. The judgment embraced advances in psychiatry and emphatically rejected the M'Naghten test by stating that, "the outrage of a frightened Queen has for far too long caused us to forego the expert guidance that modern psychiatry is able to provide."
- 1971: In the case of United States v. The New York Times regarding the newspaper's publication of the Pentagon Papers, Kaufman dissented when the Second Circuit Court decided that publishing the Pentagon Papers would threaten national security enough to justify prior restraint. The U.S. Supreme Court agreed with Kaufman and reversed the Second Circuit's decision.
- 1974: Kaufman was the chief judge in the Coniglio v. Highwood Services decision that prevented Professional Football fans from gaining redress against the NFL's policy requiring them to purchase seats for exhibition games at regular-season prices in order to qualify for season tickets.
- 1975: Kaufman presided over the three-judge appeals court panel reviewing the deportation of John Lennon and rejected the government's attempt to deport him from the United States to the United Kingdom based upon his having pleaded guilty in England to possession of hashish. After a widely publicized argument, Kaufman found that Lennon had been singled out for deportation for political reasons, allowed him to remain in the United States on what some observers characterized as a technicality, and criticized what he called the "labyrinthine provisions of the Immigration and Naturalization Act."
- 1979: Kaufman reversed a lower-court decision in Berkey v. Kodak; he ruled that "a company was entitled to protect its dominant position in the market by normal competitive methods; that the purpose of the antitrust law was to encourage competition, and not to insulate companies from competition, and that activity that resulted in lower prices and better products for the consumer was to be favored, even if that activity was harmful to individual competitors."
- 1980: Kaufman wrote an opinion in Filártiga v. Peña-Irala, 630 F.2d 876 (2d Cir. 1980). The case opened U.S. courts to foreigners who were tortured in other countries. The case has had a wide-ranging impact on human rights and the role of corporations and their foreign operations.

On July 1, 1987, Kaufman stepped down from active participation on the Second Circuit Court; he assumed a semi-retired senior status on the court until his death in 1992.

On October 7, 1987, Kaufman was presented with the Presidential Medal of Freedom by President Ronald Reagan in a ceremony in the Roosevelt Room. The previous month, The Washington Post sparked controversy when it alleged that Kaufman had only stepped down from the Second Circuit after he was promised the Medal of Freedom, a medal he long coveted. The newspaper claimed that Attorney General Edwin Meese III and other administration officials had been pressuring Kaufman to retire so that President Reagan could appoint a conservative judge to the Second Circuit. The White House denied the Post allegation, saying there was no quid pro quo arrangement.

== Death and legacy ==
Irving Kaufman died on February 1, 1992, at Mount Sinai Medical Center in Manhattan of pancreatic cancer. He was 81.

In his final years, he had been concerned about his legacy. His New York Times obituary stated:

It was Judge Kaufman's hope that he would be remembered for his role not in the Rosenberg case, the espionage trial of the century, but as the judge whose order was the first to desegregate a public school in the North; who was instrumental in streamlining court procedures, who rendered innovative decisions in antitrust law and, most of all, whose rulings expanded the freedom of the press.

But his unwavering determination to execute the Rosenbergs led to "the sole death sentences ever carried out in the United States for espionage by American civilians." As Linda Greenhouse noted, Kaufman's death penalty decision, "months into a judicial career that lasted another four decades, would be his legacy". In January 1953, after Kaufman rejected another Rosenberg request for clemency, Ethel Rosenberg wrote bitterly to her lawyer: "It strikes me that Judge Irving R. Kaufman's immortality is at last assured."

Kaufman was often frustrated by what he regarded as the distortion of judicial opinions and rulings as they passed through the filter of the mass media. In 1977 he was quoted as saying, "The judge is forced for the most part to reach his audience through the medium of the press whose reporting of judicial decisions is all too often inaccurate and superficial."

A substantial collection of Kaufman's judicial and personal papers is housed at the Library of Congress in Washington, D.C.

== See also ==
- List of Jewish American jurists
- List of United States federal judges by longevity of service

Legal offices
Preceded by Seat established by 63 Stat. 493	Judge of the United States District Court for the Southern District of New York; 1949–1961	Succeeded by John M. Cannella
Preceded by Seat established by 75 Stat. 80	Judge of the United States Court of Appeals for the Second Circuit; 1961–1987	Succeeded by John M. Walker Jr.
Preceded by Henry Friendly	Chief Judge of the United States Court of Appeals for the Second Circuit; 1973–1980	Succeeded by Wilfred Feinberg
