= Katherine Polk Failla =

American judge (born 1969)

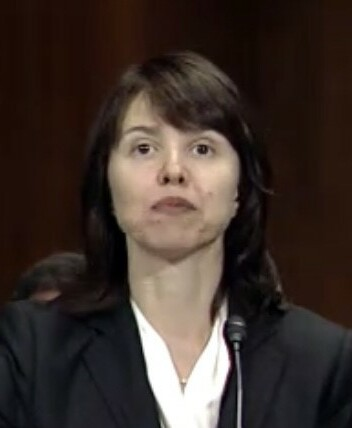
- Failla in 2012

Judge of the United States District Court for the Southern District of New York
- Incumbent
- Assumed office March 5, 2013
- Appointed by: Barack Obama
- Preceded by: Denise Cote

Personal details
- Born: Katherine Mary Polk; May 1969 (age 56–57) Edison, New Jersey, U.S.
- Education: College of William & Mary (BA); Harvard University (JD)

Katherine Mary Polk Failla (born May 1969) is a United States district judge of the United States District Court for the Southern District of New York.

== Biography ==
Failla was born in Edison, New Jersey. She received a Bachelor of Arts summa cum laude, in 1990 from the College of William & Mary. She received a Juris Doctor cum laude in 1993 from Harvard Law School. From 1993 to 1994, she served as a law clerk for Judge Joseph E. Irenas of the United States District Court for the District of New Jersey. From 1994 to 2000, she was in private practice at the law firm of Morgan, Lewis & Bockius, where she handled commercial litigation and securities enforcement and litigation matters. She became an assistant United States attorney in the Southern District of New York in 2000. From 2004 to 2008, she served as deputy chief of the Criminal Appeals Unit and from 2008 until her appointment to the bench as chief of the Criminal Appeals Unit.

Among the cases that Failla worked on while in the Criminal Appeals Unit were United States v. Odeh, et al. (prosecution of Mohammed Odeh and many others for the 1998 United States embassy bombings); United States v. Sattar, Stewart, Yousry (prosecution of Lynne Stewart and others for passing information to and from convicted terrorist Omar Abdel-Rahman, "the blind sheikh"); United States v. Stein, et al. (the KPMG tax shelter fraud case); United States v. Coplan, et al. (tax shelters promoted by Ernst & Young), and United States v. Rigas (prosecution of John Rigas for the Adelphia Communications Corporation fraud case).

=== Federal judicial service ===
On June 25, 2012, President Barack Obama, on the recommendation of Senator Chuck Schumer, nominated Failla to serve as a United States district judge of the United States District Court for the Southern District of New York, to the seat vacated by Judge Denise Cote who assumed senior status on December 15, 2011. On September 19, 2012, the Senate Judiciary Committee held a hearing on her nomination and reported her nomination to the floor on December 6, 2012, by voice vote. On January 2, 2013, her nomination was returned to the President, due to the adjournment sine die of the Senate. On January 3, 2013, the president renominated her to the same office. Her nomination was reported by the Senate Judiciary Committee on February 14, 2013, by voice vote. On March 4, 2013, the Senate confirmed the nomination by a 91–0 vote. She received her commission the next day.

Legal offices
Preceded by Denise Cote	Judge of the United States District Court for the Southern District of New York; 2013–present	Incumbent
