= Guy-Uriel Charles =

American legal scholar (born 1970)

- Born: October 6, 1970 (age 56)

Academic background
- Education: Spring Arbor University (BA); University of Michigan (JD)

Academic work
- Discipline: Law
- Sub-discipline: Civil procedure Election law
- Institutions: University of Minnesota; Duke University; Harvard University

Guy-Uriel E. Charles (born October 06, 1970) is an American legal scholar.

== Early life and education ==
Charles is of Haitian descent. He earned a Bachelor of Arts degree in political science from Spring Arbor University in 1992, then attended the University of Michigan Law School. While a student at Michigan, he helped found the Michigan Journal of Race & Law, serving as the publication's first chief editor.

== Career ==
Upon graduating from law school, Charles clerked for Judge Damon Keith. Charles was a member of the University of Minnesota Law School faculty from 2000 to 2009. At the University of Minnesota, he held the Russell M. and Elizabeth M. Bennett Professorship. In 2009, Charles began teaching at the Duke University School of Law, where he was elevated to Charles S. Rhyne Professor of Law in 2012. From 2017, Charles served as Edward and Ellen Schwarzman Professor of Law. At Duke, he was affiliated with the Haiti Lab.

In January 2021, Charles's appointment as the first Charles J. Ogletree Jr. Professor of Law at Harvard Law School was announced. In April 2021, while still affiliated with Duke University, Charles was appointed to the Presidential Commission on the Supreme Court of the United States. Charles is an elected member of the American Law Institute.
