= John M. Cannella =

American judge (1908–1996)

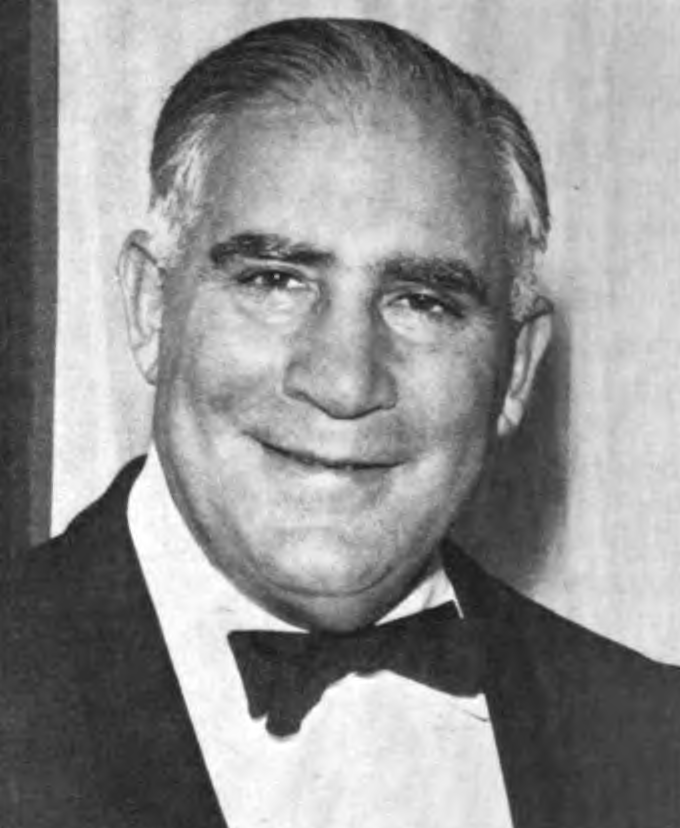

Senior Judge of the United States District Court for the Southern District of New York
- In office December 31, 1977 – October 30, 1996

Judge of the United States District Court for the Southern District of New York
- In office July 3, 1963 – December 31, 1977
- Appointed by: John F. Kennedy
- Preceded by: Irving Kaufman
- Succeeded by: Mary Johnson Lowe

Personal details
- Born: John Matthew Cannella; February 8, 1908 New York City, U.S.
- Died: October 30, 1996 (aged 88) Glen Cove, New York, U.S.
- Education: Fordham University (BS, LLB)
- Football career

Profile
- Position: Offensive lineman / Linebacker

Personal information
- Listed height: 6 ft 1 in (1.85 m)
- Listed weight: 199 lb (90 kg)

Career information
- High school: Jersey City (NJ) Dickinson
- College: Fordham

Career history
- New York Giants (1933–1934)

Awards and highlights
- NFL champion (1934)
- Stats at Pro Football Reference

John Matthew Cannella (February 8, 1908 – October 30, 1996) was a United States district judge of the United States District Court for the Southern District of New York. He previously played as an offensive lineman in the National Football League (NFL) for the New York Giants in the 1930s.

== Education and career ==
Born in New York City, Cannella received a Bachelor of Science degree from Fordham University in 1930 and a Bachelor of Laws from Fordham University School of Law in 1933. He played professional football for the New York Giants in 1933 and 1934. He was in private practice in New York City from 1935 to 1940 and was an Assistant United States Attorney of the Southern District of New York from 1940 to 1942.

During World War II, he was a United States Coast Guard Executive Officer to the Intelligence Service for the Third Naval District, from 1942 to 1945. He was then an assistant counsel in the Office of the Commissioner of Internal Revenue for New York City in 1945, and was Commissioner of the New York State Department of Water Supply, Gas and Electricity from 1945 to 1948, and of the New York State Department of Licenses from 1948 to 1949. He was an Associate Justice of the New York Court of Special Sessions from 1949 to 1963.

== Federal judicial service ==
On April 4, 1963, Cannella was nominated by President John F. Kennedy to a seat on the United States District Court for the Southern District of New York vacated by Judge Irving Kaufman. Cannella was confirmed by the United States Senate on June 28, 1963, and received his commission on July 3, 1963. He assumed senior status due to a certified disability on December 31, 1977.

A resident of the Douglaston community of Queens, he served in senior status until his death, on October 30, 1996, in Glen Cove, New York.

== Sources ==
Legal offices
Preceded by Irving Kaufman	Judge of the United States District Court for the Southern District of New York; 1963–1977	Succeeded by Mary Johnson Lowe
