= Pitts v. Black =

- Court: United States District Court for the Southern District of New York
- Full case name: Marthaann E. Pitts, et al. v. Robert S. Black, et al. etc.
- Docket nos.: 84 Civ. 5270 (MJL)
- Defendants: Robert S. Black, et al., etc.
- Plaintiffs: Marthaann E. Pitts, et al.

Court membership
- Judge sitting: Mary Johnson Lowe

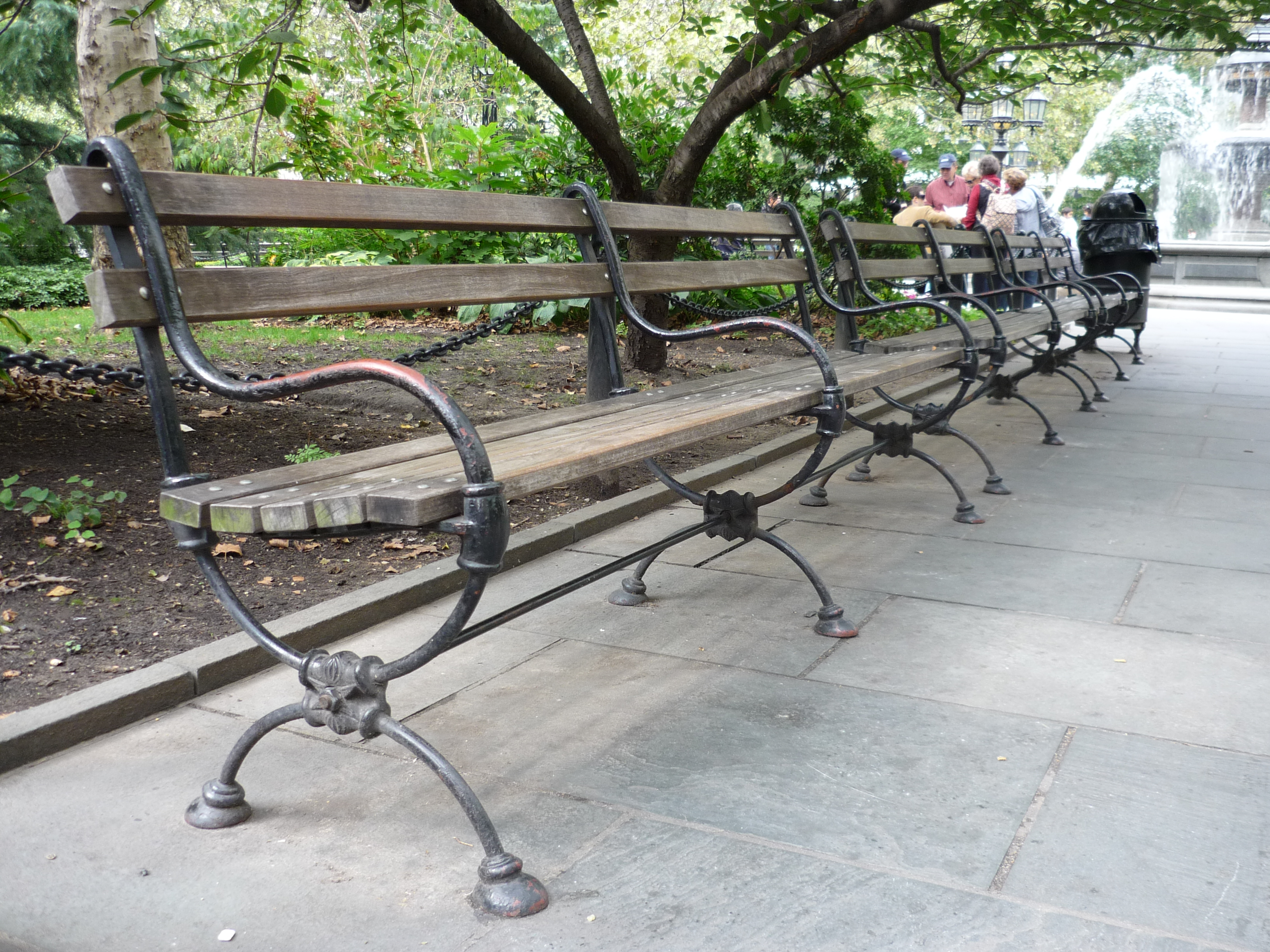
Park bench in Manhattan, New York, 2008

Pitts v. Black was a 1984 legal case in the U.S. District Court S.D.N.Y establishing eligible American voters residing in non-conventional accommodations cannot be refused to register to vote. Even a park bench can be elected to be a residence. As a result, 410 homeless voters in New York were allowed to register for the 1984 presidential election.

== Background ==
In 1984 Peter Dyer, a homeless resident of New York, was not allowed to register to vote since his residence did not comply with the relevant definition under the election law. Dyer declared that he sleeps on one of the six benches in St. Gabriels Park, New York City.

== Parties ==
The plaintiff class included homeless people Pitts, Carter and, most relevant, Peter Dyer. The nonprofit organisation Coalition for the Homeless was also a plaintiff.

The defendant was Robert S. Black as president of the New York City Board of Elections and other clerks from the same office.

The presiding judge was Mary Johnson Lowe.

== Lawsuit ==
Plaintiffs filed a lawsuit against New York City Board of Elections for disenfranchising homeless voters.

== Foreword ==
While the case involving Pitts and Carter was solved with a pre-trial court order (preliminary injunction), this particular lawsuit continued for the case of Dyer.

The preliminary injunction concluded that Pitts and Carter resided in a shelter, and therefore did meet the required eligibility criteria to vote, while Dyer resided on a bench instead.

The defendant had agreed that residing in a shelter complies with the election law, however residing on a bench did not.

== Defendant ==
The main claim of the defendant stated that homeless people do not comply with the term residence as defined under the election law: "that place where a person maintains a fixed, permanent and principal home and to which he, wherever temporarily located, always intends to return."

The defendant also argued that voter's compliance to the term residence safeguards three compelling state interest: 1) proving the link between the voter and the electoral district 2) preventing election fraud via mail check 3) preserving administrative feasibility as it is not practical to notify the homeless via mail about polling station location.

== Plaintiff ==
Dyer testified that he sleeps, eats and does other daily activities in St. Gabriels Park. He considers the park his home base and the place he intends to return when he's away.

At the trial, Hopper, an expert in Governor's Task Force on Homelessness, proposed that the homeless indicate both the non-conventional residence (e.g. a park bench) and a place to receive mails (e.g. a shelter) for electoral registration purpose. This way the connection to the community is satisfied as well as the fraud prevention and administrative feasibility.

The plaintiff argued permitting to register only the homeless residing in shelters would still discriminate many eligible voters. In fact it was assessed shelters in New York are not enough to host the whole homeless population. Moreover, many homeless refused to stay in shelters for reasons of safety, hygiene and personal pride. Therefore, it was important to establish that the homeless can designate a shelter to receive mail even if they do not sleep (reside) there.

No evidence was presented that homeless are more prone to election fraud than any other group. Against voter fraud, the Board of Elections shall use mail check, signature verification, search at the residence. Preventing election fraud shall not be pursued by precluding homeless to vote especially when the presumption of innocence always prevails, even in election law.

== Conclusion ==
Based on its findings, the court ruled that there are other ways to preserve the three compelling state interests (listed above) rather than disenfranchising a whole class of people from voting.

The definition of residence under the election law was excessively strict. The court concluded a specific location where the homeless returns regularly and a place designated to receive mail should satisfy.

On 9 October 1984, the court ruled that, by refusing the homeless to register to vote, the New York City Board of Elections was in breach of the equal protection clause under the Fourteen Amendment.

== Result ==
The judge ordered the election registration deadline, scheduled on 13 October 1984 for everybody, to be extended until 26 October 1984 for the homeless. Following the court order, 410 homeless people registered to vote, among them there was Peter Dyer.

Even to today the National Coalition for the Homeless encourages eligible American voters in non-traditional residence to register. Their campaign for the 2024 presidential election was "You Don't Need a Home to Vote".
