= Voter registration in the United States =

Requirement for most elections in the United States of America

Map of the District of Columbia, states, and territories in the United States that require voter registration to vote: Voter registration required for federal and state elections No voter registration required for federal or state elections, although some local city elections may require voter registration

All US states and territories, except North Dakota, require voter registration by eligible citizens before they can vote in federal, state and local elections. In North Dakota, cities in the state may register voters for city elections, and in other cases voters must provide identification and proof of entitlement to vote at the polling place before being permitted to vote. Voter registration takes place at the county level in many states or at the municipal level in several states. Many states set cutoff dates for registration or to update details, ranging from two to four weeks before an election, while 25 states and Washington, D.C. have same-day voter registration, which enables eligible citizens to register or update their registration on the same day they cast their vote. In states that permit early voting, and have voter registration, the prospective voter must be registered before casting a vote.

Some historical registration requirements, including poll taxes, literacy tests, and grandfather clauses, were part of the systematic disenfranchisement of African Americans in the Jim Crow South.

More recently, several common misconceptions have developed around the supposed consequences of registering to vote—that it exposes the person to the military draft, or affects car insurance rates, or requires a permanent address. Despite being untrue, these beliefs are sometimes deterrents for registration. The impact and fairness of other requirements, such as voter identification laws, are the subject of ongoing debate.

The legal case Pitts v. Black in 1984 established that eligible American voters residing in non-conventional accommodations, like a park bench, cannot be refused to register to vote, allowing people experiencing homelessness to participate in elections.

A 2023 study by the US Election Assistance Commission (EAC) found that 85.4% of the citizen voting age population (CVAP) in the United States were registered to vote at the time of the 2022 general elections, more than 203 million US citizens.

While voters were historically required to register at government offices by a certain date before an election, the federal government in the mid-1990s made efforts to increase turnout by easing the registration process. The National Voter Registration Act of 1993 (the "Motor Voter" law) requires state governments to either provide uniform opt-in registration services through drivers' license registration centers, disability centers, schools, libraries, and mail-in registration, or to allow Election Day voter registration, where voters can register at polling places immediately prior to voting.

In 2016, Oregon became the first state to make voter registration fully automatic (opt-out) when issuing driver licenses and ID cards, since followed by 15 more states and the District of Columbia. Political parties and other organizations sometimes hold voter registration drives to register new voters.

In 31 states and the District of Columbia, persons registering to vote may at the same time declare an affiliation with a political party.

== History ==
In 1800, Massachusetts was the first state to require voter registration as a prerequisite for voting in the state. This was followed by Maine (1821), Pennsylvania (1836) and Connecticut (1839). During the 19th century, and especially after the Civil War, more states and cities set a voter registration as a prerequisite to voting, partially to prevent voting by immigrants in cities. However, it was not until 1913 when Nebraska became the first state to establish a permanent statewide voter register, overseen by an election commissioner.

According to a 2020 study, voter registration laws adopted in the period 1880–1916 reduced turnout as much as 19%.

North Dakota abolished voter registration in 1951 for state and federal elections, the only state to do so. Since 2004 it has required voters to produce ID at time of casting a vote. This has led to North Dakota being accused of voter suppression because many Native American were denied a vote because the address on their tribal IDs had a post office box address, which continues to be a common practice.

In 2002, Arizona made online voter registration available. In 2016, Oregon became the first state to implement a fully automatic (opt-out) voter registration system tied to the process of issuing driver licenses and ID cards.

In March 2025, Trump's Executive Order 14148^{[ws]} on "enforcing restrictions of non-citizens from registering to vote or voting through use of databases maintained by the Department of Homeland Security" laid the groundwork for DOGE to integrate Systematic Alien Verification for Entitlements (SAVE) with data from the Social Security Administration to enable cross-checking voter registration and citizenship status via Social Security numbers. In June 2025, the Supreme Court allowed DOGE to access sensitive data in the SSA.

== No registration jurisdiction ==
North Dakota is the only state that does not have voter registration, which was abolished in 1951, although cities in North Dakota may register voters for city elections. In North Dakota voters must provide identification and proof of entitlement to vote at the polling place before being permitted to vote.

North Dakota is exempt from the requirements of the federal National Voter Registration Act of 1993. Because of this exemption, North Dakota has since 2004 required voters to produce an approved form of ID before being able to vote, one of which was a tribe ID commonly used by Native Americans. It was common and lawful for a post office box to be used on this ID, instead of a residential address, because there are no street addresses on reservations. In 2016, a change required tribal ID to have a residential address to be accepted, and North Dakota has been accused of voter suppression with many Native Americans being denied a vote because they did not have an approved form of ID with a residential address.

North Dakota's ID law especially adversely affected large numbers of Native Americans, with almost a quarter of Native Americans in the state, otherwise eligible to vote, being denied a vote on the basis that they do not have proper ID; compared to 12% of non-Indians. A judge overturned the ID law in July 2016, also saying: "The undisputed evidence before the Court reveals that voter fraud in North Dakota has been virtually non-existent." However, the denial of a vote on this basis was also an issue in the 2018 mid-term election.

== Federal jurisdiction ==
While the United States Congress has jurisdiction over laws applying to federal elections, it has deferred most aspects of election law to the states. The United States Constitution prohibits states from restricting voting rights in ways that infringe on a person's right to equal protection under the law (14th Amendment), on the basis of race (15th Amendment), on the basis of sex (19th Amendment), on the basis of having failed to pay a poll tax or any tax (14th Amendment (see: Harper v. VA Elections Board) & 24th Amendment), or on the basis of age for persons age 18 and older (26th Amendment). The administration of elections, however, vary widely across jurisdictions.

In general, US citizens over the age of 18 have the right to vote in federal elections. In a few cases, permanent residents ("green card" holders) have registered to vote and have cast ballots without realizing that doing so was illegal. Non-citizens convicted in criminal court of having made a false claim of citizenship for the purpose of registering to vote in a federal election can be fined and imprisoned for up to a year. Deportation and removal proceedings have resulted from several such cases. Some municipalities allow non-citizen residents to vote in municipal or school district elections.

All states except Maine and Vermont (and the District of Columbia) deny the vote to convicted felons for some duration, a practice known as felony disenfranchisement. In 16 states, voting is only prohibited during incarceration. 21 states additionally prohibit voting during parole or probation but allow voting after. Eleven states either indefinitely suspend voting rights or require special action to have voting rights restored.

== Security issues ==
In 2023 a contractor, WSD Digital, developing a voter registration and e-pollbook system for New Hampshire put in code to link to websites in Russia and used open source software managed by a Russian. New Hampshire found those issues by hiring another company, ReversingLabs, to review the code of the first company.

In 2016 Russian hackers probed all states and breached voter registration systems in two states. Breaches have the potential to add, remove or change voters, allowing later addition of ballots in those names.

== Effect on participation ==
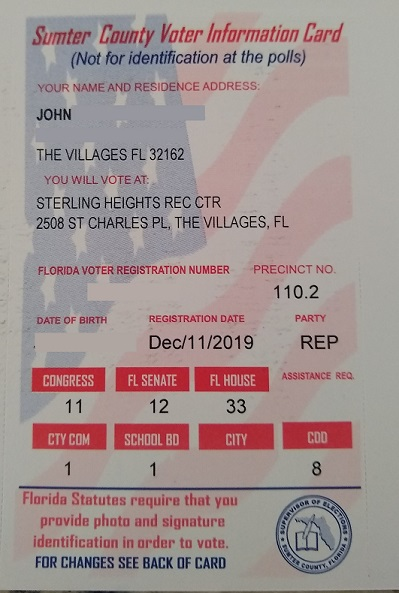
A Sumter County, Florida Voter Information Card

A 2012 study by The Pew Charitable Trusts estimates that 24% of the voting-eligible population in the United States are not registered to vote, a percentage that represents "at least 51 million eligible U.S. citizens." The study suggests that registration requirements contribute to discouraging people from exercising their right to vote, thereby causing a lower voter turnout. The extent of discouragement and its effect on increasing the socioeconomic bias of the electorate however remain contested.

In a 1980 landmark study, Raymond E. Wolfinger and Steven J. Rosenstone came to the conclusion that less restrictive registration requirements would substantially increase the electoral turnout. According to their probit analysis, if all states adopted the procedures of the most permissive state regulations, which would mean:

1. eliminating the closing date
2. opening registration offices during the forty-hour work week
3. opening registration offices in the evening or on Saturday
4. permitting absentee registration for the sick, disabled and absent

(p 73) turnout in the 1972 presidential election would have been 9.1% higher, with 12.2 million additional people having voted. In a seminal 1988 book, sociologists Richard Cloward and Francis Fox Piven argued that lowering registration requirements would improve socioeconomic equality in the composition of the electorate.

Findings such as this have inspired lawmakers to facilitate the registration process, eventually leading to the National Voter Registration Act of 1993 (or "Motor Voter" act) that required states to allow voter registration at various public offices, including drivers' license registration centers, disability centers, schools, libraries, as well as mail-in registration, unless a state adopts Election Day voter registration. The way towards passing this piece of federal legislation was however lengthy and rocky, as these reforms were highly contested. In an expanded 1990 edition of their 1988 book, titled "Why Americans still don't vote: and why politicians want it that way," Cloward and Piven argued that the reforms were expected to encourage less-privileged groups which happen to lean towards the Democratic Party.

While the turnout at federal elections did substantially increase following the electoral reforms, the effect fell short of Wolfinger and Rosenstone's expectations while Cloward's and Piven's hope of improving the demographic representativeness of the electorate wasn't fulfilled at all. Political scientist Adam Berinsky concluded in a 2005 article that the reforms designed to make voting "easier" in their entirety had an opposite effect, actually increasing the preexisting socioeconomic biases by ensuring "that those citizens who are most engaged with the political world – those with politically relevant resources – continue to participate, whereas those individuals without such resources fall by the wayside." As Berinsky reaffirms in a 2016 piece, the only way to increase turnout while improving representativeness is making more people become interested in politics.

The lack of a place of residence, a mailing address or a form of identification are barriers for the homeless to vote.

In a 2012 Pew Research Center study, researchers found that military personnel were disproportionately affected by voter registration errors. Most often these involved members of the military and their families who were deployed overseas.

== Registration centers ==
Traditionally, voter registration took place at government offices, but the federal National Voter Registration Act of 1993, which came into effect on January 1, 1995, simplified registration. The Act requires state governments to provide opt-in registration services through drivers' license registration centers, disability centers, schools, libraries, as well as providing for mail-in registration. However, six states are exempt from the streamlined processes under the Act: North Dakota, Idaho, Minnesota, New Hampshire, Wisconsin and Wyoming.

== Innovative voter registration methods ==
In the years since the 2000 presidential election, many states have implemented innovative policies that streamline the process of voter registration, promote voter list accuracy, and create options for eligible citizens to register or to update their registration. Such innovations include online voter registration, automatic voter registration, and same-day voter registration.

A May 2026 study by the Center for Election Innovation & Research found that the implementation of at least one of these three voter registration methods increased from seven states in 2000 to 46 states and DC in 2026. To underscore this point: during the 2000 general election, fewer than 6 percent of voting-age citizens lived in states with one of these registration methods. As of this study, nearly 90 percent of voting-age citizens live in states that will have at least one of these methods in place for the upcoming 2026 United States elections, and 40% of voting-age citizens now live in states that have implemented all three methods.

The maps below show the innovative registration methods available in each state and Washington, D.C., in 2026.

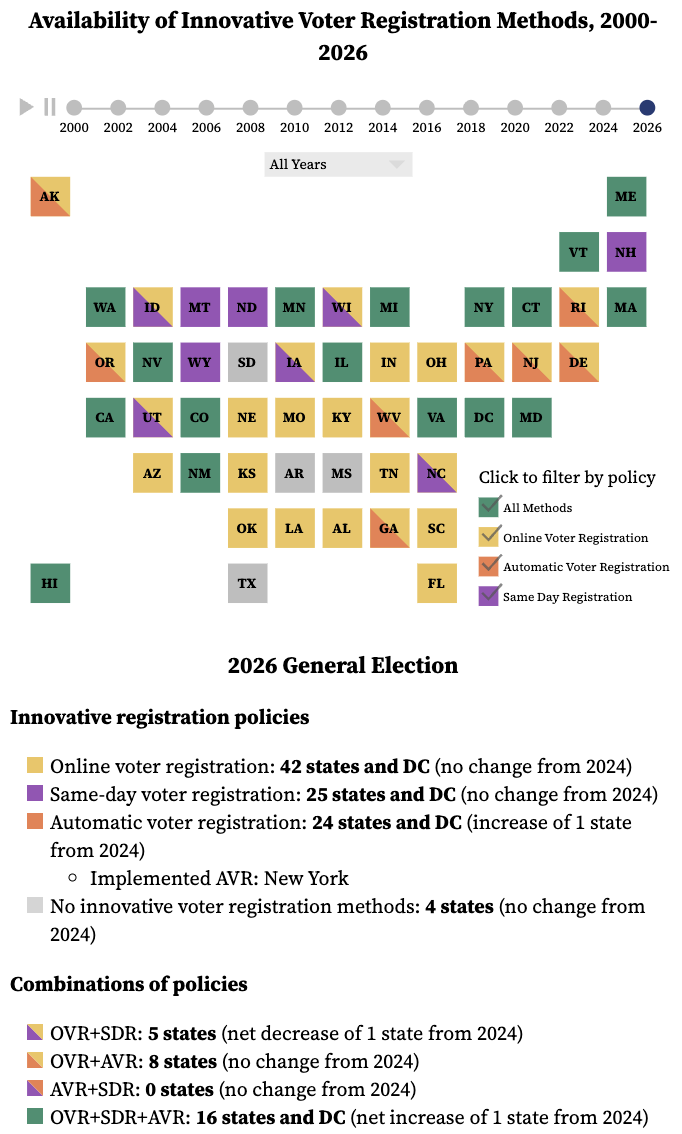
This visual shows innovative registration methods in each state and Washington, DC, in the 2025 general election.

=== Online voter registration ===
As of September 2024, online voter registration is available in 43 states and the District of Columbia. North Dakota does not have voter registration. Since a federal judicial order in September 2020, Texas allows residents to register to vote online if and when they are renewing their driver's licenses or state identification cards.

State or federal district	Date online voter registration implemented	Website
Alabama	2016-12-01	Alabama Votes
Alaska	2015-11	Alaska Online Voter Registration
Arizona	2002-07	Service Arizona Voter Registration
California	2012-09-19	California Online Voter Registration
Colorado	2010-04-01	Go Vote Colorado
Connecticut	2014-01-01	Connecticut Online Voter Registration
Delaware	2014-04	I Vote Delaware
District of Columbia	2015	District of Columbia Online Voter Registration
Florida	2017-10-01	Register to Vote Florida Voter Registration
(Georgia (U.S. state)) Georgia	2014-03	Georgia Online Voter Registration
Guam	2022	Guam Online Voter Registration
Hawaii	2015-08-04	Hawaii Online Voter Registration
Idaho	2017-12-06	Idaho Votes
Illinois	2014-06-17	Illinois Online Voter Registration
Indiana	2010-07-01	Indiana Online Voter Registration
Iowa	2016-01-04	Iowa Online Voter Registration
Kansas	2009-05	Kansas Online Voter Registration
Kentucky	2016-03-01	Kentucky Online Voter Registration
Louisiana	2010-04	Geaux Vote
Maine	2023-11	N/A
Maryland	2012-07-01	Maryland Online Voter Registration
Massachusetts	2015-06-23	Massachusetts Online Voter Registration
Michigan	2019-12-02	Michigan Online Voter Registration
Minnesota	2013-09-26	MN Votes
Missouri (Note: In Missouri, a person can register to vote online and electronically provide a signature using a mobile device, tablet computer or touchscreen computer, but not a standard desktop computer. The state reviews the information and prints out the registration form, which it sends to the person's local elections office for verification.)	2014	Vote Missouri
Nebraska	2015-09-22	Nebraska Online Voter Registration
Nevada	2012-09	Nevada Online Voter Registration
New Jersey	2020-09-04	New Jersey Online Voter Registration
New Mexico	2016-01-01	New Mexico Online Voter Registration
New York	2011	New York Electronic Voter Registration
North Carolina (Note: Prior to March 30, 2020, applicants could only apply online as an extra option in the process of conducting a separate transaction through the North Carolina Department of Motor Vehicles. In response to the closure of most DMV offices due to COVID-19, the NCDMV opened online voter registration for all holders of North Carolina driver's licenses and state ID cards and removed the need for a transaction.)	2020-03-20	North Carolina Online Voter Registration
Ohio	2017-01-01	Ohio Online Voter Registration
Oklahoma	2020	Not fully implemented yet (Note: In Oklahoma, registered voters can update their registration information online but new voters and voters who have changed names or moved to a different county must fill in a paper form.)
Oregon	2010-03-01	OreStar
Pennsylvania	2015-08-27	PA Online Voter Registration
Rhode Island	2016-08-01	RI Online Voter Registration
South Carolina	2012-10-02	S.C. Online Voter Registration
Tennessee	2017-08-29	GoVote TN Voter Registration
Texas	2020-09	N/A (Note: Since a federal judicial order in September 2020, Texas allows residents to register to vote online if and when they are renewing their driver's licenses or state identification cards. Voters with neither card must register by paper.)
Utah	2010-06	Utah Online Voter Registration
Vermont	2015-10-12	Vermont Online Voter Registration
Virginia	2013-07-23	Virginia Voter Registration
(Washington (state)) Washington	2008-01	MyVote
West Virginia	2015-09	West Virginia Online Voter Registration
Wisconsin	2017-01-09	My Vote Wisconsin

=== Automatic voter registration ===
As of September 2023, 24 states and the District of Columbia had automatic registration of citizens who interact with state agencies such as the DMV, along with 3 other states that have passed legislation or committed administratively to create automatic registration systems, but not yet implemented it. Those interacting with the state agencies have the option to opt-out of registering.

On January 1, 2016, the Oregon Motor Voter Act implemented automatic voter registration of eligible citizens tied to the process of issuing driver licenses and ID cards, with the person having the right to opt out. By April 2016 three more states – California, West Virginia, and Vermont – adopted the system, and in May 2016 Connecticut announced plans to implement it administratively rather than by legislation. Alaskan voters approved Measure 1 on November 8, 2016, to allow residents to register to vote when applying annually for the state's Permanent Dividend Fund. Voter approval of Measure 1 made Alaska the first state to implement automatic (opt-in) voter registration via ballot initiative. New York passed automatic voter registration on December 22, 2020, with implementation to commence in 2023. Several more states have considered legislation for automatic registration. On August 28, 2017, Illinois set July 1, 2018, for implementation of automatic voter registration at motor vehicle agencies, and a year later at other state agencies.

In 2023, the Center for Election Innovation & Research conducted a study of the impact of automatic voter registration in Georgia, which has operated through the state's Department of Driver Services (DDS) since 2016. Among the key findings:

- Active voter registration increased from 78 to 98 percent of eligible citizens in the first four years of AVR’s implementation
- The registered voter population became more representative of the state’s population in terms of age and gender
- The majority of new voter registrations in Georgia are now through DDS transactions.

State or federal district	Automatic voter registration implemented	Type of opt-out
Alaska	2017-03-01	back-end (post-transaction mailer)
California	2017-04	front-end (point of service)
Colorado	2017-02	back-end (post-transaction mailer)
Connecticut	2018	front-end (point of service)
Delaware	2023	back-end (post-transaction mailer)
District of Columbia	2018-06-26	front-end (point of service)
(Georgia (U.S. state)) Georgia	2016-09	front-end (point of service)
Hawaii	2021	front-end (point of service)
Illinois	2018-07-02	front-end (point of service)
Maine	2022-01	front-end (point of service)
Maryland	2019-07-01	front-end (point of service)
Massachusetts	2020-01	back-end (post-transaction mailer)
Michigan	2019-09-09	front-end (point of service)
Minnesota	2023-05-05	back-end (post-transaction mailer)
Nevada	2020-01	front-end (point of service)
New Jersey	2018-11-01	front-end (point of service)
New Mexico	2020	front-end (point of service)
New York	2020-12-22	front-end (point of service)
Oregon	2016-01-01	back-end (post-transaction mailer)
Pennsylvania	2023-09-19	front-end (point of service)
Rhode Island	2018-06	front-end (point of service)
Vermont	2017-01	front-end (point of service)
Virginia	2020-04	front-end (point of service)
(Washington (state)) Washington	2019-07	front-end (point of service)
West Virginia	2019-07	front-end (point of service)

=== Same-day voter registration ===
Most states require voters to register two to four weeks before an election, with cutoff dates varying from 15 to 30 days. An increasing number of states allow same-day voter registration (SDR), which enables eligible citizens to register to vote or update their registration on the same day they vote.

Same-day registration allows eligible citizens to register or update their registration at the polls or their local election office by showing valid identification to a poll worker or election official, who checks the identification, consults the registration list and, if they are not registered or the registration is out of date, registers them on the spot.

Twenty-five states and the District of Columbia offered same-day voter registration for the 2024 general election, which allowed any qualified resident of the state to register to vote and cast a ballot the same day.

Voter turnout is much higher in states using same-day registration than in states that do not. A 2013 report analyzing turnout in the 2012 United States presidential election had SDR states averaging at a turnout of 71%, well above the average voter turn-out rate of 59% for non-SDR states. According to official turnout data report in the 2014 edition of America Goes to the Polls, voter turnout in SDR states has averaged 10–14 percent higher than states that lack that option. A 2021 study found that same-day registration disproportionately increases turnout among young voters; young voters move more frequently, which disproportionately burdens them under traditional voter registration laws.

Federal district or state	Same day voting registration implemented	Early voting period registration implemented
California	2012	[data missing]
Colorado	2013	[data missing]
Connecticut	2012	2024
District of Columbia	2010	N/A
Hawaii	2014	[data missing]
Idaho	1994	N/A
Illinois	2005 and 2015	N/A
Iowa	2007	[data missing]
Maine	1973	N/A
Maryland	2013 and 2018	[data missing]
Michigan	2019	2019
Minnesota	1974	N/A
Montana	2005	N/A
Nevada	2019	
New Hampshire	1996	N/A
New Mexico	2019	[data missing]
North Carolina	2007	[data missing]
Utah	2018	[data missing]
Vermont	2015	[data missing]
Virginia	2022	N/A
(Washington (state)) Washington	2018	2019
Wisconsin	1975	N/A
Wyoming	1994	N/A

=== Voter re-registration ===
In many jurisdictions in the United States, registered voter must re-register to vote upon changing residential addresses (even within the same county), or changing names. In the 31 states (and District of Columbia) where voters register by political party, a voter desiring to switch party affiliation must also re-register to vote in closed primaries.

Some jurisdictions have automatic voter re-registration whereby existing registrants are automatically re-registered after changing home addresses. A 2022 study found that automatic voter re-registration would increase voter turnout in the US by 5.8 percentage points.

=== Partial automatic ===
This type does transfer some data from DMV electronically to election officials. For instance, name, age and address. However, does not fully meet the definition of an fully automated system, because it is still relying on paper forms in some way.

== Permanent and portable registration ==
Map of the District of Columbia, states, and territories in the United States that allow permanent and portable voter registration: Permanent and portable voter registration available for registered voter Briefly, but no longer, allow for permanent and portable voter registration available for registered voters who move to a precinct that has an electronic poll book or are an active military member Provisional ballots available for registered voters who move No permanent and portable registration available

As of 2014, Delaware, Hawaii, Oregon, and Texas allow registered voters who have moved within the state to update their registrations when they vote, and are given a regular ballot when they vote. Florida briefly allowed any registered voter who moved to another county and another voting precinct to vote by provisional ballot, except if "the precinct to which you have moved has an electronic poll book or you are an active military member", in which case the voter was given a regular ballot when they voted. As of 2014, the District of Columbia, Maryland, Ohio, and Utah allow registered voters who have moved within the state or the District of Columbia to vote in their new county without re-registering at their new address, but they can only vote a provisional ballot, which could require further action from the voter before it is counted.

=== Preregistration ===
Map of the District of Columbia, states, and territories in the United States that allow preregistration prior to turning 18 years old: Preregistration after turning 16 years old Preregistration after turning 17 years old Preregistration prior to turning 18 years old No preregistration; can only vote after turning 18 years old Unknown

Preregistration allows individuals younger than 18 years of age to register to vote, but not to actually vote until they reach 18. All states have some form of preregistration, starting at age 16, except for North Dakota which does not have any registration.

Federal district or state	Preregistration requirements
Alabama	18 years old by the election date
Alaska	Within 90 days preceding 18th birthday
Arizona	18 years old by the election date
Arkansas	18 years old by the election date
California	16-year-olds may preregister
Colorado	16-year-olds may preregister
Connecticut	18 years old by the election date
Delaware	16-year-olds may preregister
District of Columbia	16-year-olds may preregister
Florida	16-year-olds may preregister
Georgia	17.5-year-olds may preregister
Hawaii	16-year-olds may preregister, and 17-year-olds may register but not vote
Idaho	18 years old by the election date
Illinois	18 years old by the election date
Indiana	18 years old by the election date
Iowa	17.5-year-olds may preregister
Kansas	18 years old by the election date
Kentucky	18 years old by the election date
Louisiana	16-year-olds may preregister
Maine	17-year-olds may preregister
Maryland	16-year-olds may preregister
Massachusetts	16-year-olds may preregister
Michigan	18 years old by the election date
Minnesota	18 years old by the election date
Mississippi	18 years old by the election date
Missouri	17.5-year-olds may preregister
Montana	18 years old by the election date
Nebraska	18 years old by the election date
Nevada	17-year-olds may preregister
New Hampshire	18 years old by the election date
New Jersey	17-year-olds may preregister
New Mexico	18 years old by the election date
New York	16 year olds may preregister
North Carolina	16-year-olds may preregister
Ohio	18-year-olds by the election date
Oklahoma	18 years old by the election date
Oregon	16-year-olds may preregister
Pennsylvania	18 years old by the election date
Rhode Island	16-year-olds may preregister, and 17-year-olds may register if they will be 18 years old by the election
South Carolina	18 years old by the election date
South Dakota	18 years old by the election date
Tennessee	18 years old by the election date
Texas	Individuals 17 years and 10 months old may register
Utah	16-year-olds may preregister
Vermont	18 years old by the election date
Virginia	18 years old by the election date
Washington	18 years old by the election date
West Virginia	17-year-olds may preregister
Wisconsin	18 years old by the election date
Wyoming	18 years old by the election date

== Registration drives ==
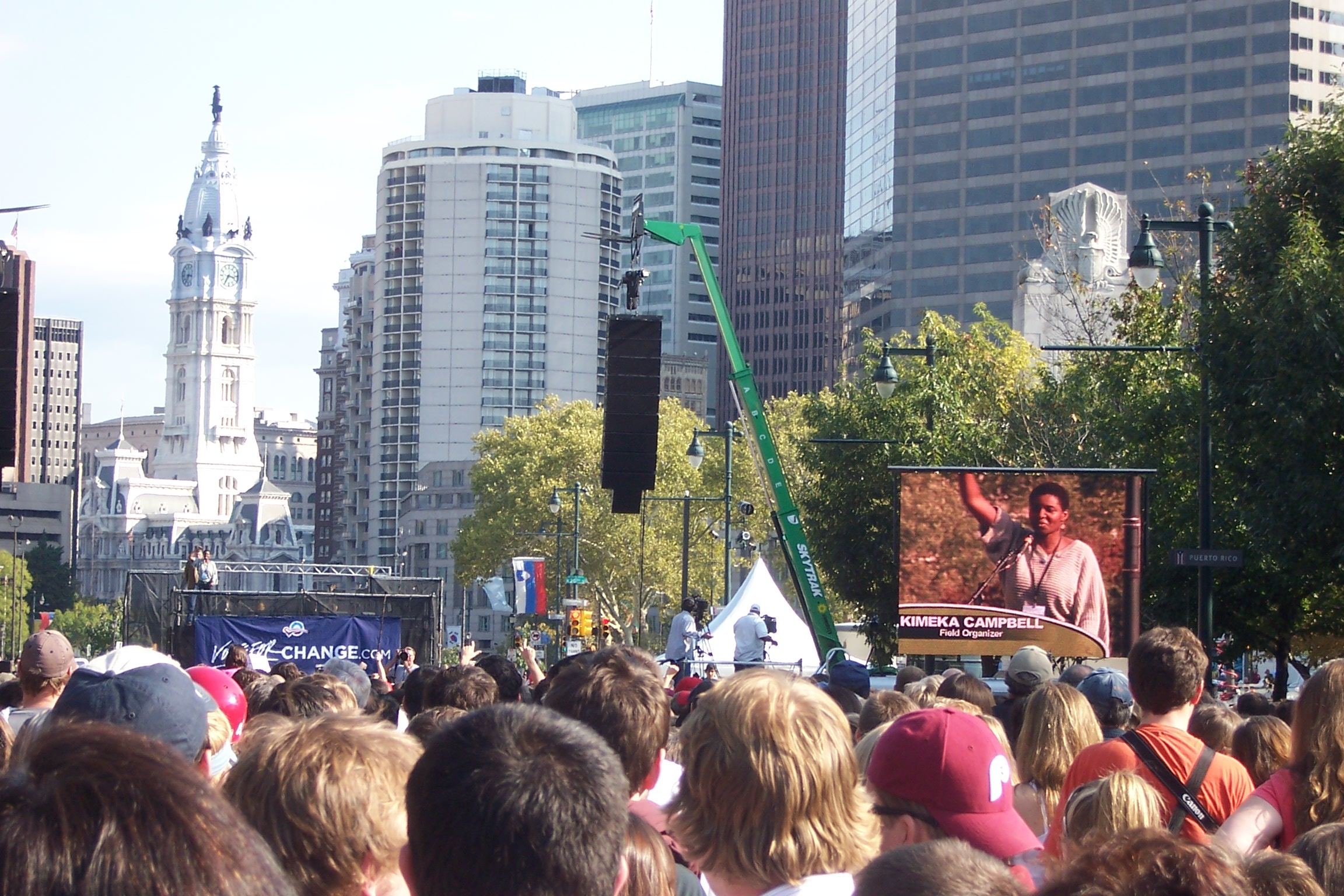
An October 2008 voter registration rally held on behalf of Barack Obama's presidential campaign, on Philadelphia's Benjamin Franklin Parkway

A voter registration drive is an effort undertaken by a government authority, political party or other entity to register to vote persons otherwise entitled to vote. In many jurisdictions, the functions of electoral authorities includes endeavors to get as many people to register to vote as possible. In most jurisdictions, registration is a prerequisite to a person being able to vote at an election.

In the United States, such drives are often undertaken by a political campaign, political party, or other outside groups (partisan and non-partisan), that seeks to register persons who are eligible to vote but are not registered. In all US states except North Dakota, registration is a prerequisite to a person being able to vote at federal, state or local elections, as well as to serve on juries and perform other civil duties. Sometimes these drives are undertaken for partisan purposes, and target specific demographic groups considered to be likely to vote for one candidate or other; on the other hand, such drives may be undertaken by non-partisan groups and targeted more generally.

In 2004, the Nu Mu Lambda chapter of Alpha Phi Alpha fraternity held a voter registration drive in DeKalb County, Georgia, from which Georgia Secretary of State Cathy Cox (Dem.) rejected all 63 voter registration applications because the fraternity did not obtain specific pre-clearance from the state to conduct their drive. Nu Mu Lambda filed Charles H. Wesley Education Foundation v. Cathy Cox (Wesley v. Cox) asserting that the Georgia's long-standing policy and practice of rejecting mail-in voter registration applications that were submitted in bundles, by persons other than registrars, deputy registrars, or "authorized persons", violated the requirements of the National Voter Registration Act of 1993 by undermining voter registration drives. A senior US District Judge upheld earlier federal court decisions in the case, which found that private entities have a right, under the federal law, to engage in organized voter registration activity in Georgia at times and locations of their choosing, without the presence or permission of state or local election officials.

Organizations that regularly work to register voters and promote citizens' engagement in elections include the following (some working nationally and others more locally):

- Advancement Project
- Black Voters Matter
- Close Up Foundation
- Democrats Abroad
- HeadCount
- League of Women Voters
- Let America Vote
- Association of Community Organizations for Reform Now
- National Association for the Advancement of Colored People
- Nonprofit VOTE
- Our Time
- Rock the Vote
- Southern Regional Council
- Southwest Voter Registration Education Project
- Student Association for Voter Empowerment
- The Voter Participation Center
- Turning Point USA
- US Vote Foundation
- United States Hispanic Chamber of Commerce
- Vote.org
- Voto Latino
- Women Engaged (led by Malika Redmond and focused on Georgia)

== Party affiliation ==
States which feature partisan voter affiliation questions on voter registration forms States which have passed legislation to feature partisan voter affiliation questions on voter registration forms No partisan affiliation questions on voter registration forms

In 32 states and the District of Columbia, voters are allowed to mark their party affiliation, or their unaffiliated status, on their voter registration form. In those states which host closed primaries for political parties, voters are often mandated to declare their party affiliation prior to receiving a primary ballot, whether on the day of the primary or by a prior deadline. In addition, regardless of the method of primary in these states, voters who are party-affiliated in their voter files are most often allowed to participate in intra-party elections and decision-making. Missouri, an open-primary state, became the most recent state to add an optional party affiliation question on voter registration forms in 2023.

=== States with party affiliation questions ===
Federal district of state	Party affiliation question?	Year of adoption
Alabama	No	N/A
Alaska	Yes	?
Arizona	Yes	?
Arkansas	Yes	?
California	Yes	?
Colorado	Yes	?
Connecticut	Yes	?
Delaware	Yes	?
District of Columbia	Yes	?
Florida	Yes	?
Georgia (US state)	No	N/A
Hawaii	No	N/A
Idaho	Yes	2011
Indiana	No	N/A
Illinois	No	N/A
Iowa	Yes	?
Kansas	Yes	?
Kentucky	Yes	
Louisiana	Yes	?
Maine	Yes	?
Maryland	Yes	?
Massachusetts	Yes	1916
Michigan	No	N/A
Minnesota	No	N/A
Mississippi	No	N/A
Missouri	Yes	2023
Montana	No	N/A
Nebraska	Yes	?
Nevada	Yes	?
New Hampshire	Yes	?
New Jersey	Yes	?
New Mexico	Yes	?
New York	Yes	?
North Carolina	Yes	?
North Dakota	No	N/A
Ohio	No	N/A
Oklahoma	Yes	?
Oregon	Yes	?
Pennsylvania	Yes	?
Rhode Island	Yes	?
South Carolina	No	N/A
South Dakota	Yes	?
Tennessee	No	N/A
Texas	No	N/A
Utah	Yes	?
Vermont	No	N/A
Virginia	No	N/A
Washington	No	N/A
West Virginia	Yes	?
Wisconsin	No	N/A
Wyoming	Yes	?

=== Deadline to re-register with a party for a primary election ===
Federal district of state	Deadline to re-register with a political party for a partisan primary election	Deadline to re-register with a political party for the 2020 US Presidential Caucuses and Primary elections
Colorado	29th day prior to the partisan primary election	2020-02-03
Connecticut	3 months prior to the partisan primary election	[data missing]
Delaware	The last Saturday in May of the year of the partisan primary election	[data missing]
District of Columbia	21st day prior to the partisan primary election	[data missing]
Idaho	10th Friday prior to the partisan primary election (Note: In Idaho, unaffiliated registered voters may re-register up to and on the partisan primary day)	[data missing]
Kansas	14th day prior to the partisan primary election (Note: In Kansas, unaffiliated registered voters may re-register up to and on the partisan primary day)	[data missing]
Kentucky	December 31 of the year prior to the partisan primary election	[data missing]
Maine	15th day prior to the partisan primary election (Note: In Maine, unenrolled registered voters may re-register up to and on the partisan primary day)	[data missing]
New Hampshire	1st Tuesday of June of the year of the partisan primary election (Note: In New Hampshire, unafflicted registered voters may re-register up to and on the partisan primary day)	[data missing]
New Jersey	55th day prior to the partisan primary election (Note: In New Jersey, unaffiliated registered voters may re-register up to and on the partisan primary day)	2020-04-08
New York	The Friday 10 weeks before the Presidential Primary Election in 2020	2020-02-14
Oregon	21st day prior to the partisan primary election	2020-04-28
Rhode Island	30th day prior to the partisan primary election	[data missing]
Wyoming	14th day prior to the partisan primary election	[data missing]

== Youth voting ==
In some cities, people younger than 18 can vote in local elections, such as for city councils and school boards. Takoma Park, Maryland, was the first city to allow youth voting, starting in 2013. Other nearby cities, including Hyattsville, Greenbelt and Riverdale Park adopted similar measures.

Young people in the United States vote much less often than older adults. According to Held, this is mainly due to confusion about voter registration rules. The rule states that anyone who will be 18 come election day is allowed to vote, but many people falsely think that they must be 18 by the registration deadline, which tends to be weeks earlier. This misunderstanding mostly affects people voting for the first time, since they are inherently less familiar with how elections work. The study also states that young people who miss their first chance to vote are much less likely to vote in future elections because they likely never registered at all. Voting at a young age helps to build habit which means that early confusion can lead to less civil engagement for years. Overall, making the system easier to understand would play a big part in getting young people to vote early which would then lead to more young people participating in elections and having their voices heard.

== See also ==
- Voter ID laws in the United States
