= Michigan Journal of Race & Law =

- Discipline: Civil Rights Law
- Language: English

Publication details
- History: 1996–present
- Frequency: biannual

Standard abbreviations
- Bluebook: Mich. J. Race & L.
- ISO 4: Mich. J. Race Law

Indexing
- ISSN: 1095-2721
- OCLC no.: 34802273

Links
- Journal homepage

The Michigan Journal of Race & Law is a student-run civil rights journal published at the University of Michigan Law School. The Journal began publication in 1996 and publishes semiannually. The editors and staff of the journal hold film series, critical race theory events, and symposia on issues related to the intersection of race and law. Anita Hill is one of the journal's contributors.

== History of the journal ==
In the fall of 1993, four third-year law students at the University of Michigan Law School, Heather Martinez, Eddy Meng, Leslie Newman, and Dan Varner, reconstituted the then-defunct minority scholarship reading group as the Critical Race Theory Reading Group. The Reading Group gave its participants, individually and collectively, the opportunity to read many of the authors who inspired them and made meaningful their experiences in law school. The Reading Group also provided a forum in which to explore issues of racial inequality; issues that were pervasive in the minds and lives of the students, but strangely absent in the traditional law school environment.

By the following year, the Reading Group participants had come to recognize the monthly discussions of critical race scholarship as a necessary component of legal education, but it somehow was not enough. There were two options available at that time to further promote and advance discourse on issues relating to race and law. One involved lobbying the existing law journals to adequately address issues of racial inequality in their publication. This avenue included advocating that the existing journals alter their membership policies to increase the number of students of color on their staffs. Yet this option brought with it the limitations inherent in attempting to operate within the parameters of preexisting institutions. The other option — which ultimately turned out to be the most viable and desirable — was to form a new journal that adequately recognized the voices of people of color and that was dedicated unequivocally to discussing issues of racial inequality in the law. The founding and development of the Michigan Journal of Race & Law itself was led by Michigan Law School students Guy-Uriel Charles and Travis Richardson.

The Journal planned a symposium, Toward a New Civil Rights Vision, to bring together practitioners, scholars, students, and activists to address critical issues relating to race and law. The symposium, held on October 13 and 14, 1995, explored contemporary social and legal issues, with an eye toward constructing, practically and theoretically, a civil rights jurisprudence for the 21st century. The speakers included The Hon. A. Leon Higginbotham Jr., Prof. Derrick Bell, Prof. Kimberlé Crenshaw and Prof. Theodore M. Shaw. The symposium spurred lively discussions and generated several papers and student notes. Several of the papers presented at the conference, along with additional contributions from other authors, were printed in the inaugural volume of the Michigan Journal of Race & Law.

To encourage diversity in legal scholarship, the Journal has published "The Guide" for breaking into legal scholarship.

The first issue of the Journal was published in Winter 1996.
