= Richard Pildes =

American legal scholar

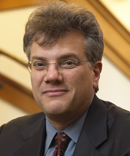
- Born: Chicago, Illinois, U.S.
- Education: Princeton University (BA); Harvard University (JD)
- Scientific career
- Fields: Constitutional law
- Institutions: New York University School of Law; University of Michigan Law School

Richard H. Pildes is an American legal scholar who is the Sudler Family Professor of Constitutional Law at the New York University School of Law and an expert on constitutional law, the Supreme Court, the system of government in the United States, and legal issues concerning the structure of democracy, including election law. His scholarship focuses on public law and legal issues affecting democracy.

== Early life and education ==
The son of two Chicago-area physicians, Pildes graduated summa cum laude with an A.B. in chemistry from Princeton University in 1979 after completing a 74-page long senior thesis titled "Infrared Laser Induced Gas-Surface Interactions." He later received his J.D., magna cum laude, from Harvard Law School in 1983, where he was the Supreme Court Editor on the Harvard Law Review. He clerked for Judge Abner J. Mikva of the U.S. Court of Appeals for the District of Columbia and for Justice Thurgood Marshall of the U.S. Supreme Court, after which he practiced law in Boston.

== Academic career ==
He began his academic career at the University of Michigan Law School, where he was assistant and then full professor of law from 1988 until 1999, when he joined the NYU School of Law faculty. He has been a visiting professor at the University of Chicago Law School, Harvard Law School, and Yale Law School.

Pildes is a co-author of the casebook, The Law of Democracy (5th ed. 2016). He was assisted with the development of the first edition of the casebook by then-University of Chicago Law School lecturer Barack Obama. His scholarship focuses on election issues, including voting rights, political parties, campaign finance, alternative voting systems (such as cumulative voting), the history of disfranchisement in the United States, and the general relationship between constitutional law and democratic politics in the design of democratic institutions themselves. He has written about the Supreme Court, the separation of powers, the powers of the President, and expressive theories of law.

Pildes successfully argued a case from Alabama involving the unconstitutional use of race in redistricting before the United States Supreme Court. He was also among counsel for a Supreme Court that challenged the secrecy of judicial proceedings in the United States Tax Court. He was part of the legal team that unsuccessfully argued against political gerrymandering in the 2009 case Rucho v. Common Cause. He also defended the Sarbanes-Oxley Act before the Supreme Court.

Professor Pildes has acted as a media commentator on election law issues. He was part of the NBC Team, working with Tom Brokaw, that was nominated for an Emmy for its coverage of the 2000 United States presidential election, and has worked as an Election Analyst for CNN. He has written columns published in the Washington Post, The New York Times, The Wall Street Journal, The New Republic, The American Prospect, The Hill, Politico, and other publications. In 2022, Pildes testified before the House of Representatives about what he sees as the dangers of the Independent state legislature theory.

Pildes was elected as a member of the American Academy of Arts and Sciences in 2008 and as a member of the American Law Institute. He received a Guggenheim Fellowship and was honored as a Carnegie Scholar.

In 2021, Pildes participated in the Presidential Commission on the Supreme Court of the United States.

== Representative bibliography ==
- The Law of Democracy: Legal Structure of the Political Process with Pamela S. Karlan, Samuel Issacharoff. 2nd ed. (2001).
- When Elections Go Bad: The Law of Democracy and the Presidential Election of 2000 with Pamela S. Karlan, Samuel Issacharoff. Rev. ed. (2001).
- The Future of the Voting Rights Act with David Epstein, Rodolfo de la Garza and Sharyn O'Halloran.
- "Separation of Parties, Not Powers." with Daryl Levinson. 119 Harvard Law Review 2311 (2006).
- "The Supreme Court, 2003 Term-Foreword: The Constitutionalization of Democratic Politics." 118 Harvard Law Review 29 (2004).
- "Democrats and Technocrats," with Cass Sunstein. Journees d'études juridiques Jean Dabin (2004).
- "Competitive, Deliberative, and Rights-Oriented Democracy," 3 Election Law Journal 685 (2004).

== See also ==
- List of law clerks for the tenth seat of the Supreme Court of the United States
- Shaw v. Reno
