= Viola Canales =

American writer

- Born: April 21, 1957 (age 69); McAllen, Texas, U.S.
- Education: Harvard University (BA, JD)
- Partner: Pamela S. Karlan

Viola Canales (born April 21, 1957) is an American lawyer. She is a lecturer in law at Stanford Law School as well as a writer who has published two novels, a short story collection, and a book of poetry. She is best known for The Tequila Worm (2005), which won several awards, including the Pura Belpré Award and others.

== Education ==
Originally from McAllen, Texas, Canales received a scholarship to attend St. Stephen's Episcopal School in Austin, Texas, when she was 15 years old. She was matriculated at Harvard College in 1979 but took two leaves of absence during her undergraduate years to first work as a community organizer for United Farm Workers and secondly to serve in the United States Army at Fort Benning. She graduated cum laude in 1986 and went on to earn her Juris Doctor from Harvard Law School in 1989.

== Career ==
She was also stationed in West Germany during her time in the United States Army, was a platoon leader and served as a tactical director overseeing the Patriot and Hawk missile systems. She reached the rank of captain.

After graduating from Harvard Law School, Canales worked at O'Melveny & Myers, a white-shoe law firm in Los Angeles, where she worked for the Christopher Commission, which was established in 1991 to investigate the Los Angeles Police Department for assaulting Rodney King. She also served as Civil Service Commissioner in Los Angeles and San Francisco. In 1994, Canales was appointed regional administrator for the Small Business Administration in the Clinton Administration, where she helped guarantee $3 billion in loans annually in California, Nevada, Arizona, Hawaii, and Guam. She is currently a lecturer at Stanford Law School, where she teaches courses that combine law and fiction writing.

She published a short story collection, Orange Candy Slices and Other Secret Tales (2001), and a novel, The Tequila Worm (2005), for which in 2006 she won the Pura Belpré Award, a PEN Center USA Award, and was named a notable book by the American Library Association. In 2014, she published a bilingual collection of poems, The Little Devil and the Rose: Lotería Poems / El diablito y la rosa: Poemas de la lotería and in October 2020, she published her second novel, Cecilia's Magical Mission.

== Personal life ==
Her partner is Pamela Karlan, a professor of law at Stanford Law School and Principal Deputy Assistant Attorney General in the Civil Rights Division in the Biden administration.

== Bibliography ==
- Canales, Viola (2001). Orange Candy Slices and Other Secret Tales. Arte Público Press. ISBN 978-1-55885-332-4.
- — (2005). The Tequila Worm. Penguin Random House. ISBN 978-0-385-74674-8.
- — (2014). The Little Devil and the Rose: Lotería Poems / El diablito y la rosa: Poemas de la lotería. Arte Público Press. ISBN 978-1-55885-792-6.
- — (2020). Cecilia's Magical Mission. Arte Público Press. ISBN 978-1-55885-877-0.
