= Cynthia Estlund =

American law professor

- Born: 1957 (age 68–69); Wisconsin, United States
- Education: Lawrence University (BA); Yale University (JD)
- Occupation: Professor
- Employer: New York University School of Law
- Known for: New York University School of Law
- Spouse: Samuel Issacharoff (m. 1986)
- Children: 2

Cynthia Estlund (born 1957) is the Catherine A. Rein Professor of Law at the New York University School of Law.

== Background ==
Estlund graduated from Lawrence University with a B.A. in government, summa cum laude, in 1978. She then studied government programs for working parents in Sweden as a Thomas J. Watson Fellow, becoming fluent in Swedish. Her great-grandparents immigrated to Minnesota from Sweden.

Estlund earned her J.D. at Yale Law School in 1983 and was a Notes Editor for the Yale Law Journal. After a judicial clerkship with Judge Patricia M. Wald on the U.S. Court of Appeals for the D.C. Circuit, Estlund reported on the prosecution of human rights abuses in Argentina as a J. Roderick MacArthur Fellow. She practiced law for several years, primarily with the labor law firm of Bredhoff & Kaiser.

== Career ==
Estlund joined the University of Texas School of Law faculty in 1989 and was Regents Professor of Law and Associate Dean for Academic Affairs. She subsequently joined the Columbia Law School faculty in 1999, where she was the Isidore and Seville Sulzbacher Professor of Law and additionally the Vice Dean for Research until her move to NYU in 2006.

Estlund teaches labor law, employment law, and property law and has published numerous articles on the subject of labor and employment. In her book Working Together: How Workplace Bonds Strengthen a Diverse Democracy (Oxford University Press 2003), she argued that the workplace is a site of both comparatively successful integration and intense cooperation and sociability, and explored the implications for democratic theory and for labor and employment law. She has over twenty publications in peer-reviewed journals, including the leading law reviews.

== Personal life ==
Estlund's brother is the philosopher David Estlund. Her husband Samuel Issacharoff is also a professor at New York University School of Law.

== Publications ==
Books

- A New Deal for China's Workers? (Harvard University Press, 2017)
- Research Handbook on The Economics of Labor and Employment Law (Edward Elgar Publishing, 2012) (ed. with Michael L. Wachter)
- Regoverning the Workplace: From Self-Regulation to Co-Regulation (Yale University Press, 2010)
- Working Together: How Workplace Bonds Strengthen a Diverse Democracy (2003)
- Research Handbook on the Economics of Labor and Employment Law (2008) edited with Michael Wachter

Articles

- "What Should We Do After Work? Automation and Employment Law," 128 Yale L.J. 254 (2018)
- "Rethinking Autocracy at Work (book review)," 131 Harv. L. Rev. 795 (2018)
- "The Black Hole of Mandatory Arbitration," 96 N.C. L. Rev. 679 (2018)
- "Truth, Lies, and Power at Work," 30 U. Minn. L. Rev. Headnotes 349 (2017)
- "The 'Constitution of Opportunity' in Politics and in the Courts," 94 Tex. L. Rev. 1447 (2016)
- "Are Unions a Constitutional Anomaly?," 114 Mich. L. Rev. 170 (2015)
- "Extending the Case for Workplace Transparency to Information About Pay," 4 U.C. Irvine L. Rev 781 (2014)
- "Will Workers Have a Voice in China's 'Socialist Market Economy'? The Curious Revival of the Workers Congress System," 36 Comp. Lab. L. & Pol'y J. 69 (2014)
- "Workplace Democracy for the Twenty-First Century? Rethinking a Norm of Worker Voice in the Wake of the Corporate Diversity Juggernaut," 14 Nev. L.J. 309 (2014)
- "Labor Law Reform Again? Reframing Labor Law as a Regulatory Project," 16 N.Y.U. J. Legis. & Pub. Pol'y 383 (2013)
- "The Battle over the Board and the Future of Employee Voice in the U.S," 21 New Lab. F. 77 (2012)
- "'It Takes a Movement'—But What Does It Take to Mobilize the Workers (in the U.S. and China)?," 15 Emp. Rts. & Emp. Pol'y J. 507 (2011)
- "Just the Facts: The Case for Workplace Transparency," 63 Stan. L. Rev. 351 (2011)
- "Corporate Self-Regulation and the Future of Workplace Governance," 74 Chi.-Kent L. Rev. 617 (2009) "Who Mops the Floors at the Fortune 500? Corporate Self-Regulation and the Low-Wage Workplace," 12 Lewis & Clark L. Rev. 671 (2008)
- "Are Unions Doomed to Being a 'Niche Movement' in a Competitive Economy? A Response to Professor Wachter," 155 U. Pa. L. Rev. Pennumbra 101 (2007)
- "The Story of Washington Aluminum," in Employment Law Stories (Samuel Estreicher and Gillian Lester, ed., Foundation Press)
- "Between Rights and Contract: Arbitration Agreements and Non-Compete Covenants as a Hybrid Form of Employment Law," 155 University of Pennsylvania Law Review 379 (2007)
- "The Story of Price Waterhouse v. Hopkins," in Employment Discrimination Stories (Joel Friedman, ed., Foundation Press, 2006)
- "Rebuilding the Law of the Workplace in an Era of Self-Regulation," 105 Columbia Law Review 319 (2005)
- "Putting Grutter to Work: Diversity, Integration, and Affirmative Action in the Workplace," 14 Berkeley Journal of Employment & Labor Law 1 (2005)
- "Working Together: Crossing Color Lines at Work," 46 Labor History 77 (2005)
- "An American Perspective on Fundamental Labor Rights," in Social and Labour Rights in a Global Context (Robert Hepple, ed., Cambridge University Press, 2002)
- "The Ossification of American Labor Law," 102 Columbia Law Review 1527 (2002)
- "How Wrong Are Employees About Their Rights, and Why Does It Matter?," 77 New York University Law Review 6 (2002)
- "Working Together: The Workplace, Civil Society, and the Law," 89 Georgetown Law Journal 1 (2000)
- "Harassment Law and the First Amendment: A Window on the Role of the Workplace in a Democratic Society," in Sexual Harassment in the Workplace: Proceedings of New York University 51st Annual Conference on Labor (Samuel Estreicher, ed., Kluwer Press, 1999)
- "Freedom of Expression in the Workplace and the Problem of Discriminatory Harassment," 75 Texas Law Review 687 (1997)
- "Wrongful Discharge Protections in an At-Will World," 74 Texas Law Review 1655 (1996)
- "Free Speech and Due Process in the Workplace," 71 Indiana Law Journal 101 (1995)
- "Labor, Property, and Sovereignty after Lechmere," 46 Stanford Law Review 305 (1994)
- "Economic Rationality and Union Avoidance: Misunderstanding the National Labor Relations Act," 71 Texas Law Review 921 (1993)
- "What Do Workers Want? Employee Interests, Public Interests, and Freedom of Expression Under the National Labor Relations Act," 140 University of Pennsylvania Law Review 921 (1992)
- "Speech on Matters of Public Concern: The Perils of an Emerging First Amendment Category," 59 George Washington University Law Review 1 (1990)
