= Fragile Democracies =

2015 book by Samuel Issacharoff

Fragile Democracies: Contested Power in the Era of Constitutional Courts
- Cover
- Author: Samuel Issacharoff
- Language: English
- Series: Cambridge Studies in Election Law and Democracy
- Subject: Constitutional courts, democratization, comparative constitutional law
- Publisher: Cambridge University Press
- Publication date: June 11, 2015
- Media type: Hardcover, paperback, e-book
- Pages: 298
- ISBN: 978-1-107-03870-7
- OCLC: 915136547
- Dewey Decimal: 347/.035
- LC Class: K3161.I84 2015

Fragile Democracies: Contested Power in the Era of Constitutional Courts is a 2015 book by Samuel Issacharoff.

Based on court decisions from countries including Germany, Turkey, India, Israel, Spain, South Africa, Colombia, South Korea, Thailand, and the post-Soviet states of Eastern Europe, Issacharoff argues that strong constitutional courts have been the principal institutional safeguard of the democracies created during the third wave of democratization, both against antidemocratic parties that operate through elections and against the consolidation of power by dominant parties and incumbents.

== Background ==
In an interview with Jack Balkin published on the legal blog Balkinization in July 2015, Issacharoff said that two American events had the paradoxical effect of directing his attention abroad: the intervention of the Supreme Court in the contested presidential election of 2000 and the debates over liberty and security that followed the September 11 attacks. Each struck him as "a familiar point of crisis in democracies," a threat to the openness of democratic politics and a succession crisis. He realized he lacked a good command of how countries facing such threats more regularly dealt with them. He said that he had watched "with some amazement" as Mexico's electoral tribunal handled that country's contested 2006 presidential election with relative ease, and that the more he studied newly minted democracies such as Mexico and South Africa, the more he was struck by a generalizable pattern of courts serving as stabilizing institutions during periods of democratic fragility.

In the same interview, Issacharoff described the book's thesis as paradoxical: courts, which lack the power of the purse or the sword, can help stabilize democracy at the moments when political power is most contested. He explained that courts lower the stakes of elections in countries that are "democracies without a well-established demos", where a first election risks becoming a one-shot referendum on which group will hold state power, and he called the resulting strategy of constitutional constraint "democratic hedging". He stated that courts have no proven track record of lowering historic antagonisms of race, religion, or ethnicity as such, but that they can improve the prospects of a second election in which a governing party can be dislodged and can protect disfavored groups from exclusion.

Asked what prevents political leaders from simply replacing judges with loyalists, Issacharoff answered that "in the long run, courts will succumb to consolidated political power", and that the question is what institutional buffers (judicial appointment guarantees, civil society, other domestic institutions, and international judicial and economic pressure) emerge while power is being consolidated. Responding to critics who hold judicial review to be inconsistent with democracy, he cautioned against generalizing from the stable United States to the contested societies of the post-1989 world and said he preferred to treat the question of whether strong-court constitutionalism can sustain democracy in fractured societies as an empirical one: "does it work?"

== Summary ==
Issacharoff focuses on the quarter century of democratization that followed the fall of the Berlin Wall, when new constitutional democracies emerged from the collapse of the Soviet Union, the end of apartheid in South Africa, and transitions from authoritarian rule in Latin America and East Asia. He argues that most of these democracies arose in what he calls fractured societies, divided along racial, ethnic, or religious lines, where an election risks becoming a referendum on which group will capture the state. Elections alone, he writes, cannot produce stable democratic rule: the pattern of the postcolonial era was "one man, one vote, one time". Earlier state-builders had relied on consociational power sharing among rival groups, while the third-wave democracies turned to constitutionalism and to strong constitutional courts able to constrain elected majorities. The book collects a decade of Issacharoff's articles applying his work on the American law of democracy to other countries. He assigns courts two roles: policing the boundaries of the electoral arena, and easing transitions from authoritarian rule by reassuring the likely losers of the first elections.

The first part, "Militant Democracy", concerns how democracies may defend themselves against parties that use elections to undermine democratic rule, a problem associated with the Nazi rise through the institutions of the Weimar Republic. Issacharoff contrasts the American approach, under which political speech is either criminally punishable or fully protected and courts require a clear and present danger before the state may act, with the practice of most other democracies, which ban parties, regulate campaign speech, or restrict electoral participation without waiting for imminent criminal conduct. He sorts the targeted groups into parties tied to insurrectionary or terrorist organizations, separatist parties, and mass antidemocratic movements that compete for majority power. He looks at how courts in Germany, Spain, Turkey, India, and Israel, along with the European Court of Human Rights, have policed such restrictions, including the German Federal Constitutional Court's bans on the Socialist Reich Party and the Communist Party in the 1950s, the dissolution of Turkey's Welfare Party, and India's electoral speech code. He thinks that the power to exclude should rest with independent courts rather than with incumbents.

In the second part of the book, "Competitive Democracy", Issacharoff deals with the consolidation of power by the winners of the first democratic elections. He considers the second election rather than the first as the test of a democracy: whether incumbents can be voted out of office. Uncontested rule brings what he terms the "three C's" of cronyism, corruption, and clientelism. He argues that constitutional courts are best placed to resist this drift toward "one-partyism", citing the South African Constitutional Court's certification of the post-apartheid constitution against the 34 principles negotiated in the transition from apartheid, the Colombian Constitutional Court's refusal to allow President Álvaro Uribe a third term, the Indian Supreme Court's basic structure doctrine, and cases from Mongolia, South Korea, Hungary, Ukraine, Mexico, Poland, and Thailand. A chapter on the constitutional bargain asks why rival factions create such courts, treating constitutions as incomplete agreements and courts as gap-fillers and as an "insurance policy" for the likely losers of the first elections.

Courts, lacking purse and sword, are strongest when political power is divided and weakest once a single party has consolidated control, as the Russian and Hungarian constitutional courts illustrate. Judicial intervention can also misfire. In Thailand, the constitutional court's confrontation with an elected government preceded a military coup. "The great challenge", Issacharoff writes, "particularly for the constitutional courts that are the focus here, was how to ensure that the first election was not the last election." He leaves open whether courts can stabilize democratic governance in fragile settings. Entrusting them with stewardship over the democratic enterprise was "certainly a valiant experiment".

== Reviews ==
David E. Landau called the book "a major contribution to a burgeoning literature" on the ways courts can protect and improve what Issacharoff calls fragile democracies. Landau praised the typology of antidemocratic threats and restrictions in the first half and the "richly drawn" treatment of Turkey. He also suggested that the book underemphasized the risks of judicial empowerment. Courts, he wrote, are often products of their political regimes and that high courts in Nicaragua and Honduras had recently used the unconstitutional constitutional amendment doctrine to strike down term limits at the behest of incumbents. Landau took that misuse as a reason for the more robust theorizing about judicial regulation of electoral markets that the book called for, rather than as a refutation of it, and judged the study "certain to be an agenda-defining work in the field of comparative constitutional law".

Sascha Kneip wrote that the book had arrived "in the right spot at the right time", and that with democratic recession in Hungary, Poland, and perhaps even the United States its scope reached well beyond emerging democracies to whether and how law can protect democracy against its internal and external enemies. The first part seemed to him to preach "to the (European) converted", though he found it bore on problems then facing constitutional courts in Europe and beyond. What the "highly perceptive, intellectually challenging, and empirically rich" study showed, he concluded, was that the answer depends on institutional structures, actors' orientations, and political culture, the last of which Issacharoff's focus on new democracies had given not quite enough attention.

In her review of the book in French, Marine They read it as an examination of the stabilizing mechanisms present, or missing, in the democracies born of the collapse of the Soviet bloc, showing that new democracies had chosen to entrust their stability to constitutional courts, an aspect she called apparently neglected by legal scholarship. She added that a judicial body could not by itself make up for rulers' lack of commitment to democratic government, and that the book's principal interest lay in its comparative constitutional analysis.
