= Denise Cote =

American judge (born 1946)

Senior Judge of the United States District Court for the Southern District of New York
- Incumbent
- Assumed office December 15, 2011

Judge of the United States District Court for the Southern District of New York
- In office August 10, 1994 – December 15, 2011
- Appointed by: Bill Clinton
- Preceded by: Mary Johnson Lowe
- Succeeded by: Katherine Polk Failla

Personal details
- Born: October 13, 1946 (age 79) St. Cloud, Minnesota, U.S.
- Education: St. Mary's College (BA); Columbia University (MA, JD)

Denise Louise Cote (born October 13, 1946) is a senior United States district judge of the United States District Court for the Southern District of New York.

== Early life and education ==
Cote was born in St. Cloud, Minnesota. She received a Bachelor of Arts degree from St. Mary's College in 1968 and a Master of Arts in history from Columbia University in 1969, after which she taught U.S. history, world history, and African-American history at the Convent of the Sacred Heart, a school in Manhattan. Cote then attended Columbia Law School, where she was Notes & Comments Editor of the Columbia Law Review, and she received her Juris Doctor in 1975.

== Professional career ==
After law school, Cote clerked for Judge Jack B. Weinstein of the United States District Court for the Eastern District of New York from 1975 to 1976. Cote worked in private practice as a litigator in New York City from 1976 to 1977 at Curtis, Mallet-Prevost, Colt & Mosle, and again from 1985 to 1991 at Kaye Scholer. She also served as an Assistant United States Attorney of the Southern District of New York in the office's Criminal Division from 1977 to 1985, and returned to the U.S. Attorney's Office in 1991 under U.S. Attorney Otto G. Obermaier to serve as Chief of the SDNY Criminal Division, the first woman to ever serve in that position. As Chief of the Criminal Division, Cote supervised approximately 140 lawyers and overhauled the USAO's training program for young attorneys. In 1994, Cote briefly served as a Special Assistant to the Assistant United States Attorney General of the Criminal Division at the United States Department of Justice in Washington, D.C., before being confirmed to her federal judgeship.

== Federal judicial service ==
Cote serves as a United States district judge of the United States District Court for the Southern District of New York. Cote was nominated by President Bill Clinton on April 26, 1994, to a seat vacated by Mary Johnson Lowe. She was confirmed by the United States Senate on August 9, 1994, received her commission on August 10, 1994, and took office on August 11, 1994. She assumed senior status on December 15, 2011.

Among Cote's most famous cases in recent years were the federal securities and ERISA class-action lawsuits brought by former employees or investors in WorldCom against former directors and officers of WorldCom; its auditor, Arthur Andersen; and more than 10 investment banks that sold WorldCom securities.

Cote regularly sits by designation on the United States Court of Appeals for the Second Circuit. Cote has also taught as an adjunct professor at Columbia Law School and Benjamin N. Cardozo School of Law.

Cote is a member of the "Patent Pilot Project" in the Southern District of New York.

== Noteworthy rulings ==
McDermott v. Monday, Monday LLC (S.D.N.Y. February 22, 2018) In a formal opinion, Judge Cote described attorney Richard Liebowitz as a "copyright troll". She also wrote a definition of the term: "A copyright troll plays a numbers game in which it targets hundreds or thousands of defendants seeking quick settlements priced just low enough that it is less expensive for the defendant to pay the troll rather than defend the claim." Liebowitz requested that the term be redacted from the opinion, but Cote denied his request.

United States v. Apple Inc., no. 12 Civ. 2862 (S.D.N.Y. July 10, 2013): In May 2012, Cote refused to dismiss lawsuits alleging that in the fall of 2009, Apple Inc., then preparing to launch the iPad, had conspired to drive up the price of electronic books above the prices that Amazon.com had been charging. In December 2013, Cote approved a settlement of the antitrust claims, in which the publishers paid into a fund that provided credits to customers who had overpaid for books due to the price fixing.

United States v. Aleynikov, 737 F. Supp. 2d 173 (S.D.N.Y. 2010): Cote granted in part and denied in part a motion to dismiss the indictment by criminal defendant Sergey Aleynikov, a former computer programmer for Goldman Sachs, who was alleged to have stolen trade secrets from that firm in violation of the Economic Espionage Act, the National Stolen Property Act, and the Computer Fraud and Abuse Act. Aleynikov was convicted following jury trial on the claims which were not dismissed and later sentenced to approximately eight years in prison. On February 16, 2012, the United States Court of Appeals for the Second Circuit heard oral argument on his appeal and, later that same day, ordered his conviction reversed and a judgment of acquittal entered, with opinion to follow. Aleynikov was immediately released from custody the next day. On April 11, 2012, Hon. Dennis Jacobs, Chief Judge of the United States Court of Appeals, published a unanimous decision in a written opinion stating: "On appeal, defendant argues, inter alia, that his conduct did not constitute an offense under either statute. He argues that: [1] the source code was not a “stolen” “good” within the meaning of the National Stolen Property Act, and [2] the source code was not “related” to a product “produced for or placed in interstate or foreign commerce” within the meaning of the Economic Espionage Act. The judgment of the district court is reversed."

Travelers Casualty and Surety Company v. Dormitory Authority of the State of New York, 732 F. Supp. 2d 347 (2010), 734 F. Supp. 2d 368 (2010), and 735 F. Supp. 2d 42 (2010): In a series of summary-judgment rulings, Cote reviewed and applied a number of legal concepts relevant to construction litigation -- including "your work" insurance exclusions, no-damages-for-delay clauses, the economic-loss doctrine, the viability of claims for negligent misrepresentation under New York law against architects and construction managers, and the categories of permissible claimants under performance and payment bonds—to novel and complex factual circumstances arising out of the $300 million construction of a new vertical campus for Baruch College.

In re Tyson, 433 B.R. 68 (S.D.N.Y. 2010): Cote, reviewing a bankruptcy court's decision following trial in an adversary proceeding involving the bankruptcy estate of Mike Tyson, discussed the concept of piercing the corporate veil under English law and distilled its doctrinal principles.

In re Application of MobiTV, Inc., 712 F. Supp. 2d 206 (S.D.N.Y. 2010): Cote, sitting as the rate court under the 1941 consent decree between the United States and the American Society of Composers, Authors and Publishers ("ASCAP"), established a reasonable license fee for the public performance of ASCAP compositions via wireless and Internet-based audio and audiovisual services provided by MobiTV.

Barclays Capital, Inc. v. Theflyonthewall.com, 700 F. Supp. 2d 310 (S.D.N.Y. 2010): Following a bench trial, Cote concluded that the defendant, an Internet-based subscription service which aggregated and sold stock recommendations to investors, was liable to the plaintiffs—three investment firms which issued the stock recommendations that the defendant marketed to its clients—under a theory of "hot news misappropriation" under New York law.

In re Application of Cellco Partnership, 663 F. Supp. 2d 363, 366 (S.D.N.Y. 2009): Cote, sitting as the rate court under the 1941 consent decree between the United States and ASCAP, concluded that the playing of a ringtone on a mobile phone did not constitute a "public performance" subject to licensing fees.

United States v. Awad, 518 F. Supp. 2d 577 (2007): In a drug-trafficking case involving an alleged conspiracy to import, possess, and distribute khat, Cote denied the post-trial motions by defendants following their conviction at jury trial.

United States ex rel. Anti-Discrimination Center v. Westchester County, 495 F.Supp.2d 375 (S.D.N.Y. 2007): Cote denied a motion to dismiss by the defendant county, finding that the plaintiff had successfully alleged that the county had violated federal law by accepting federal funding for affordable housing and then misrepresenting the nature and success of its efforts to further such housing. Cote later granted partial summary judgment to the plaintiff, 2009 WL 455269 (S.D.N.Y. Feb. 24, 2009), and the case later settled.

Presbyterian Church of Sudan v. Talisman Energy, Inc., 453 F. Supp. 2d 633 (S.D.N.Y. 2006): Cote, granting summary judgment to the defendant—a Canadian energy company sued under the Alien Tort Claims Act for alleged violations of international law in the Southern Sudan—described the elements of theories of conspiracy and aiding-and-abetting liability under international law.

In re Wireless Telephone Services Antitrust Litigation, 385 F. Supp. 2d 403 (S.D.N.Y. 2005): Cote, granting summary judgment to defendants on plaintiff's antitrust "tying" claims, held that the plaintiff had failed to demonstrate that defendants had market power when the defendant had a market share of less than 30 percent.

In re WorldCom, Inc. Securities Litigation, 346 F. Supp. 2d 628 (S.D.N.Y. 2004): Rejecting the summary-judgment motions brought by defendant underwriters for bond offerings issued by WorldCom, Inc., Cote held that comfort letters rendered by auditors of WorldCom did not excuse the underwriters from their legal obligation to conduct an investigation into WorldCom's unaudited interim financial statements.

United States v. Dupre, 339 F. Supp. 2d 534 (S.D.N.Y. 2004): Cote, entertaining a criminal defendant's proffer of expert evidence that the defendant's belief in God contributed to her reasonable belief that she was involved in legitimate business activity, rejected the defendant's argument that such evidence was admissible for the purpose of tending to negate proof of the defendant's mens rea with respect to wire fraud and conspiracy charges.

In re WorldCom, Inc. Securities Litigation, 294 F. Supp. 2d 392 (S.D.N.Y. 2003): In large part, Cote denied the motions to dismiss a class-action complaint brought by investors against officers, directors, accountants, underwriters, and outside analysis of WorldCom, Inc.

United States v. Frank, 8 F. Supp. 2d 253 (S.D.N.Y. 1998): Cote upheld the federal Death Penalty Act of 1994, in the first challenge made in the Second Circuit to the constitutionality of that statute.

United States v. Skowron, Docket Number: 1:11-cr-00699 (S.D.N.Y. 2011): Cote sentenced hedge fund portfolio manager Chip Skowron to five years in prison for insider trading.

Lumen View Technology, LLC v. Findthebest.com, Inc.: In May 2014, Cote issued the first decision under Octane Fitness v. ICON, requiring a patent troll to pay attorneys fees to a defendant in a patent infringement case that she found to be "baseless litigation".

In September 2017 she ruled in the Anthony Weiner sexting scandal.

== Notes ==
Legal offices
Preceded by Mary Johnson Lowe	Judge of the United States District Court for the Southern District of New York; 1994–2011	Succeeded by Katherine Polk Failla
