= Taylor v. Board of Education of City School District of New Rochelle =

First US court case addressing segregation in the North

Taylor v. Board of Ed. of City Sch. Dist. of New Rochelle
- Court: United States District Court for the Southern District of New York
- Full case name: Taylor v. Board of Education of City School District of New Rochelle
- Decided: May 31, 1961
- Citation: 195 F. Supp. 231 (S.D.N.Y. 1961)

Holding
- The court found that the Board of Education of the City of New Rochelle had deliberately created and maintained segregation through the policies in place at Lincoln School and across the district.

Court membership
- Chief judge: Irving Kaufman

Taylor v. Board of Education of City School District of New Rochelle, 195 F. Supp. 231 (S.D.N.Y. 1961), was a decision by the United States District Court for the Southern District of New York, which ruled that the Board of Education in New Rochelle, NY had created a segregated school system through racially discriminatory policies that confined all black children to Lincoln School, while allowing white families to transfer their children to all-white schools. Considered the first school segregation case in the north, the ruling was appealed to the Supreme Court where it was upheld, leading to the razing of Lincoln School and the institution of city-wide busing for elementary school students to ensure racial diversity across the district.

== Background ==
A series of policies set in place beginning in the 1930s sought to confine all black students in New Rochelle Public Schools to Lincoln School while utilizing gerrymandering, biased transfer procedures, and other methods to allow white students to attend other schools. Parents of black children including Hallie Taylor, growing increasingly frustrated with the lack of resources at Lincoln, enlisted Paul B. Zuber to bring the case on their behalf. Additional Civil Rights organizations and leaders contributed to the case, including an amicus brief from the Urban League of Westchester County.

== Ruling and Appeal ==
Judge Irving Kaufman issued the ruling in this case, holding that that Board of Education in New Rochelle created a segregated environment at Lincoln School through policies which allowed white students to transfer elsewhere in the district but not black students. Further, he held that any student at Lincoln School should be allowed to transfer, provided sufficient space is available at one of the other schools in the city. The case is considered one in which "de-facto segregation" was instituted in a municipality through the manipulation of school district borders rather than through explicitly racial policy.

The district opposed the ruling and appealed to the Supreme Court, but they declined to hear the case and allowed the ruling to stand, leading to the introduction of busing as an integration strategy in the city's schools, and to the razing of Lincoln School. In 1986, a commemorative plaque was placed in Lincoln Park, site of the former school building.
