= Samuel Issacharoff =

American law professor (born 1954)

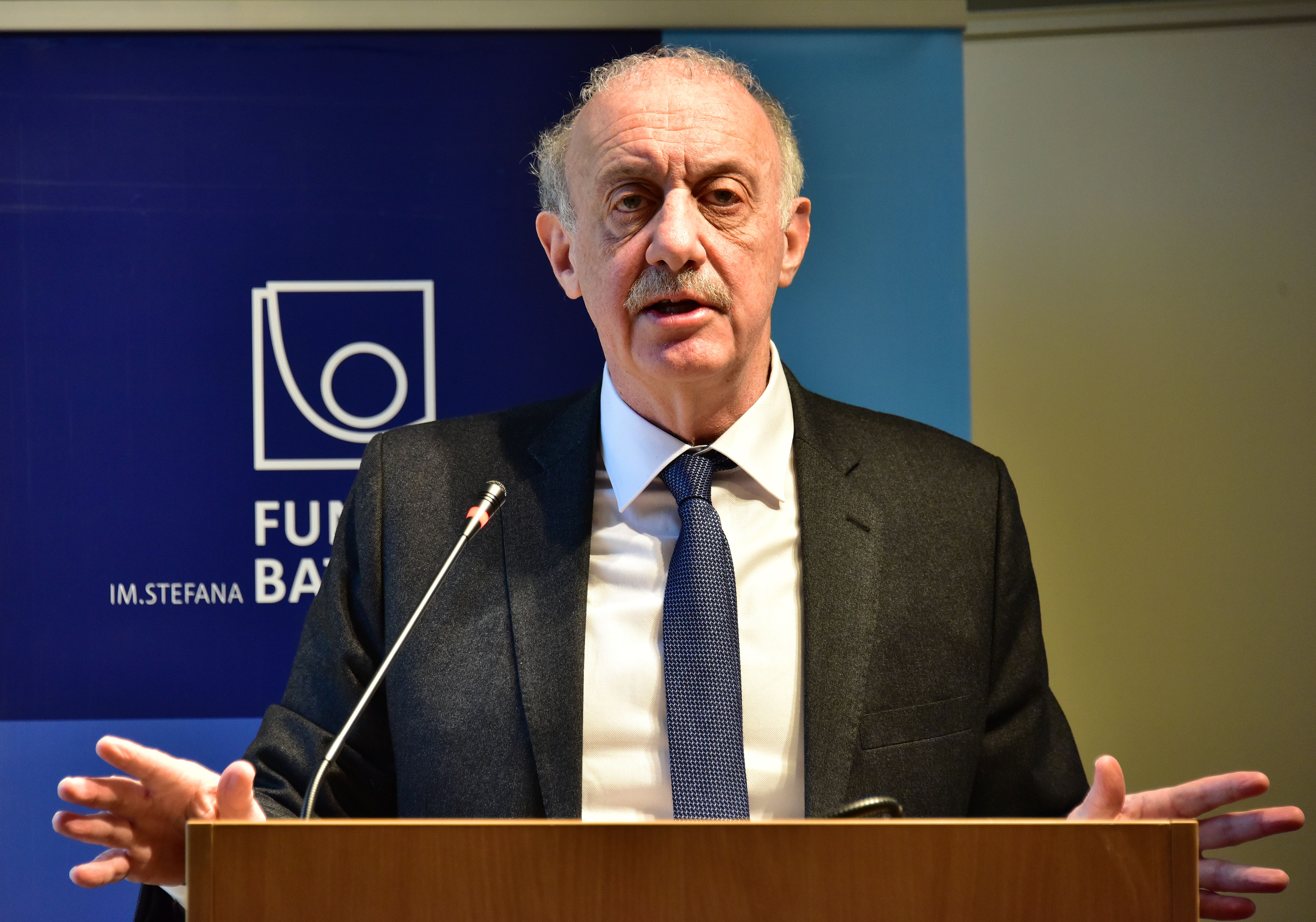
Image of Samuel Issacharoff

Samuel Issacharoff (born 1954) is an American legal scholar. His scholarly work focuses on constitutional law, voting rights and civil procedure. He is the Bonnie and Richard Reiss Professor of Constitutional Law at New York University School of Law.

== Early life and education ==
Issacharoff was born in Argentina in Buenos Aires. Issacharoff's mother was born in Argentina, and his father was born in Uruguay. Both his parents were secular Jews. Issacharoff attended high school in New York City.

Issacharoff completed his B.A. with a major in History at the State University of New York at Binghamton in 1975. Issacharoff earned his Juris Doctor from Yale Law School in 1983, where he was also an editor for the Yale Law Journal.

== Career ==
He is the Bonnie and Richard Reiss Professor of Constitutional Law at New York University School of Law. He was a visiting professor at Harvard Law School for the Fall 2008 semester. Prior to joining NYU Law's faculty, he taught at Columbia Law School and The University of Texas School of Law.

Issacharoff is a life member of the American Law Institute (ALI), having previously been the lead Reporter for the ALI's Principles of the Law of Aggregate Litigation. In 2021, Issacharoff argued the case TransUnion LLC v. Ramirez at the Supreme Court on behalf of the respondent.

== Personal life ==
His wife, Cynthia Estlund, is a labor and employment-law professor, also at New York University School of Law.

== Publications ==
- The Supreme Court, 2012 Term — Comment: Beyond the Discrimination Model on Voting, 127 Harv. L. Rev. 95 (2013).
- The Supreme Court, 2009 Term — Comment: On Political Corruption, 124 Harv. L. Rev. 118 (2010).
- Fragile Democracies, 120 Harv. L. Rev. 1405 (2007).
- Party Funding and Campaign Financing in International Perspective with Keith Ewing (eds.) (2006) ISBN 1-84113-570-4
- Civil Procedure (2005) ISBN 1-58778-034-8 (pbk. : alk. paper).
- The Law of Democracy: Legal Structure of the Political Process with Pamela S. Karlan, Richard H. Pildes. (1998) ISBN 1-56662-462-2 (alk. paper).
- The State of Voting Rights Law (1993).
- When Elections Go Bad: The Law of Democracy and the Presidential Election of 2000 with Pamela S. Karlan, Richard H. Pildes. Rev. ed. (2001) ISBN 1-58778-233-2 (alk. paper)
- Democracy unmoored: populism and the corruption of popular sovereignty, (Oxford University Press, 2023).
- Fragile Democracies: Contested Power in the Era of Constitutional Courts, (Cambridge Univ. Press, 2015).
