= Joshua Douglas =

American legal scholar

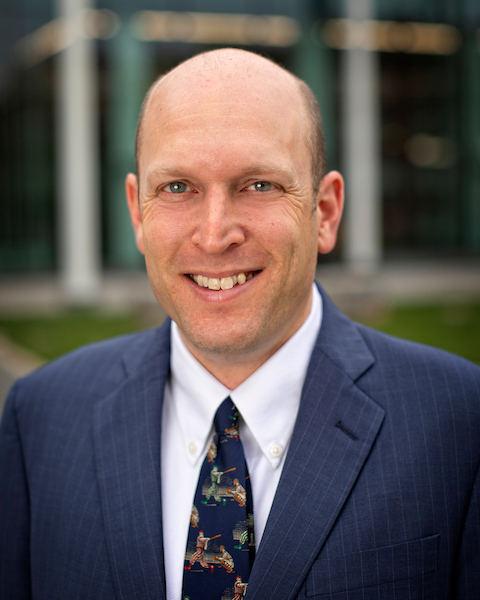
- Education: George Washington University (BA, JD)
- Occupation: Legal scholar
- Website: https://joshuaadouglas.com/

Joshua A. Douglas is an American legal scholar and attorney who currently serves as a professor and the associate dean for research at the University of Kentucky Rosenberg College of Law.

== Education and early career ==
Douglas earned his Bachelor of Arts degree from George Washington University and his Juris Doctor from George Washington University Law School. He clerked for Edward C. Prado and joined the Akin, Gump, Strauss, Hauer & Feld law firm before starting his teaching career at the University of Kentucky College of Law in 2010.

== University of Kentucky tenure ==
He was granted an associate professorship at the University of Kentucky in 2014, where he first held the Robert G. Lawson & William H. Fortune Associate Professorship of Law. Douglas founded a blog for UK's Election Law Society during the 2014 United States elections. During the 2014 election cycle, the 2015 Kentucky elections, and the 2016 United States presidential election, he oversaw the university's student-led live election analysis. By 2019, Douglas had been appointed to the Thomas P. Lewis Professorship of Law. In 2020, he was named Ashland, Inc-Spears Distinguished Research Professor of Law.

Douglas is an elected member of the American Law Institute.

== Publications ==
Douglas is the author of Vote for US: How to Take Back our Elections and Change the Future of Voting, a popular press book that provides hope and inspiration for a positive path forward on voting rights. His next book is titled The Court vs. The Voters: The Troubling Story of How the Supreme Court Has Undermined Voting Rights, which is an urgent and gripping look at the erosion of voting rights and its implications for democracy, told through the stories of 9 Supreme Court decisions—and the next looming case.

He is also the host and writer of Democracy Optimist, a radio series and podcast that explores election law and voting rights. In 2025, Democracy Optimist won a regional Edward R. Murrow Award for Best Podcast.
