= Homeless vote in United States =

Participation of the homeless in elections in the United States

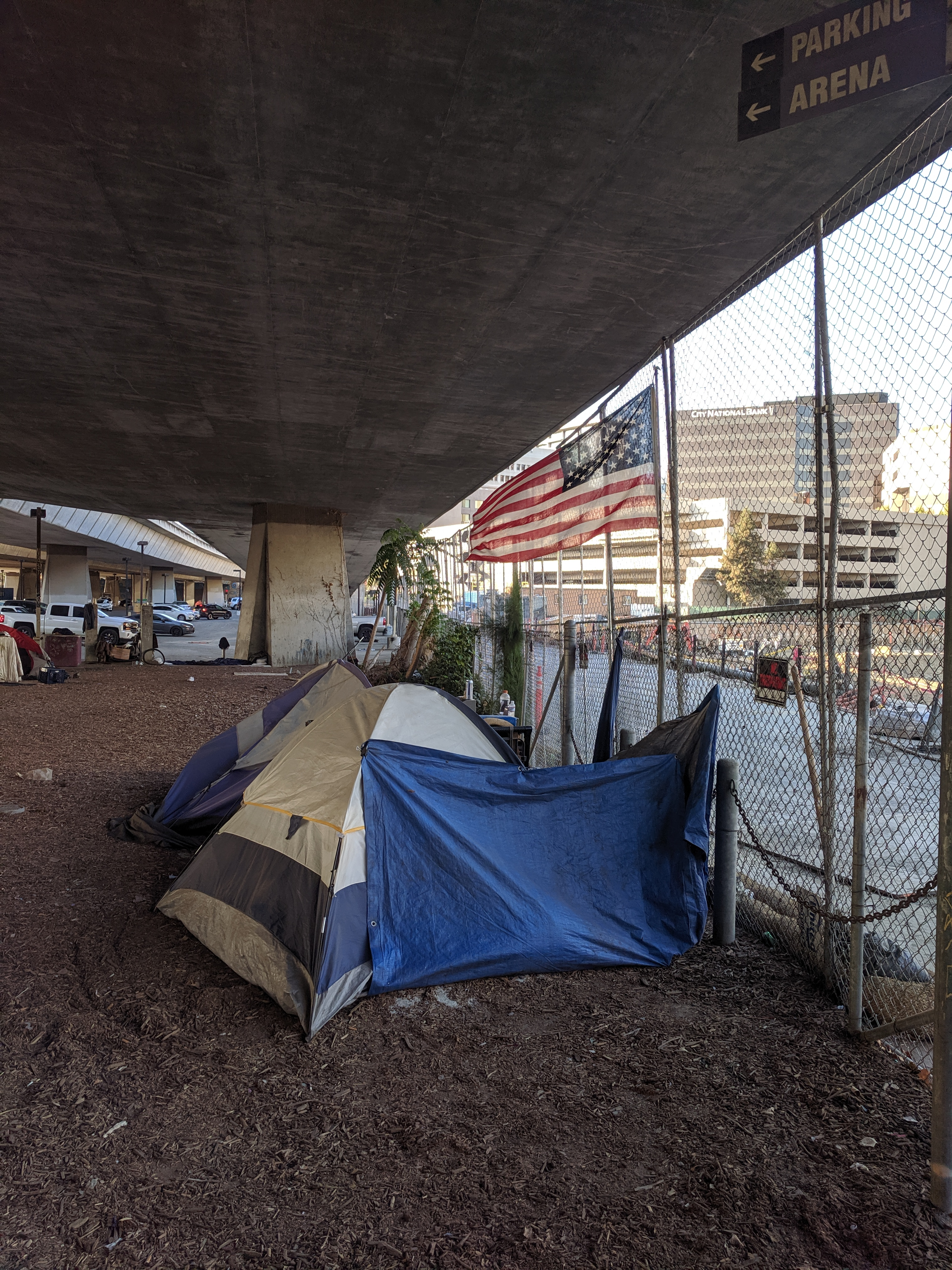
A homeless encampment in San Jose, California

The number of homeless people in U.S., age 18 and above, is around half a million (541,484) at any given point in 2023 according to the Annual Homelessness Assessment Report (AHAR). The National Coalition for the Homeless estimates that, at each election, around 10% of the homeless exercise the right to vote.

== Barriers to homeless vote ==
There are barriers for the homeless to register to vote. They may lack a place of residence, a mailing address or a form of identification. Having a place to live is not a prerequisite to vote. As argued in 1984 case Pitts v. Black, people are eligible to vote even if they do not live in traditional accommodations. The cost of transport to the ballot station is also an obstacle for the homeless to vote as well as the feeling of being politically disenfranchised.

For registration purposes, homeless people can use the mailing address of shelters or religious institutions or post offices. Each state has its own voter registration requirements.

Point-In-Time Estimates of Homelessness in U.S.
Year	Elections	Est. number of homeless	Est. age 18 and above
2012	Presidential	633,782	N/a
2014	Midterm	578,424	439,602
2016	Presidential	549,928	429,109
2018	Midterm	552,830	441,238
2020	Presidential	580,466	474,102
2022	Midterm	582,462	484,218
