= Pamela S. Karlan =

American legal scholar (born 1959)

Pamela Karlan
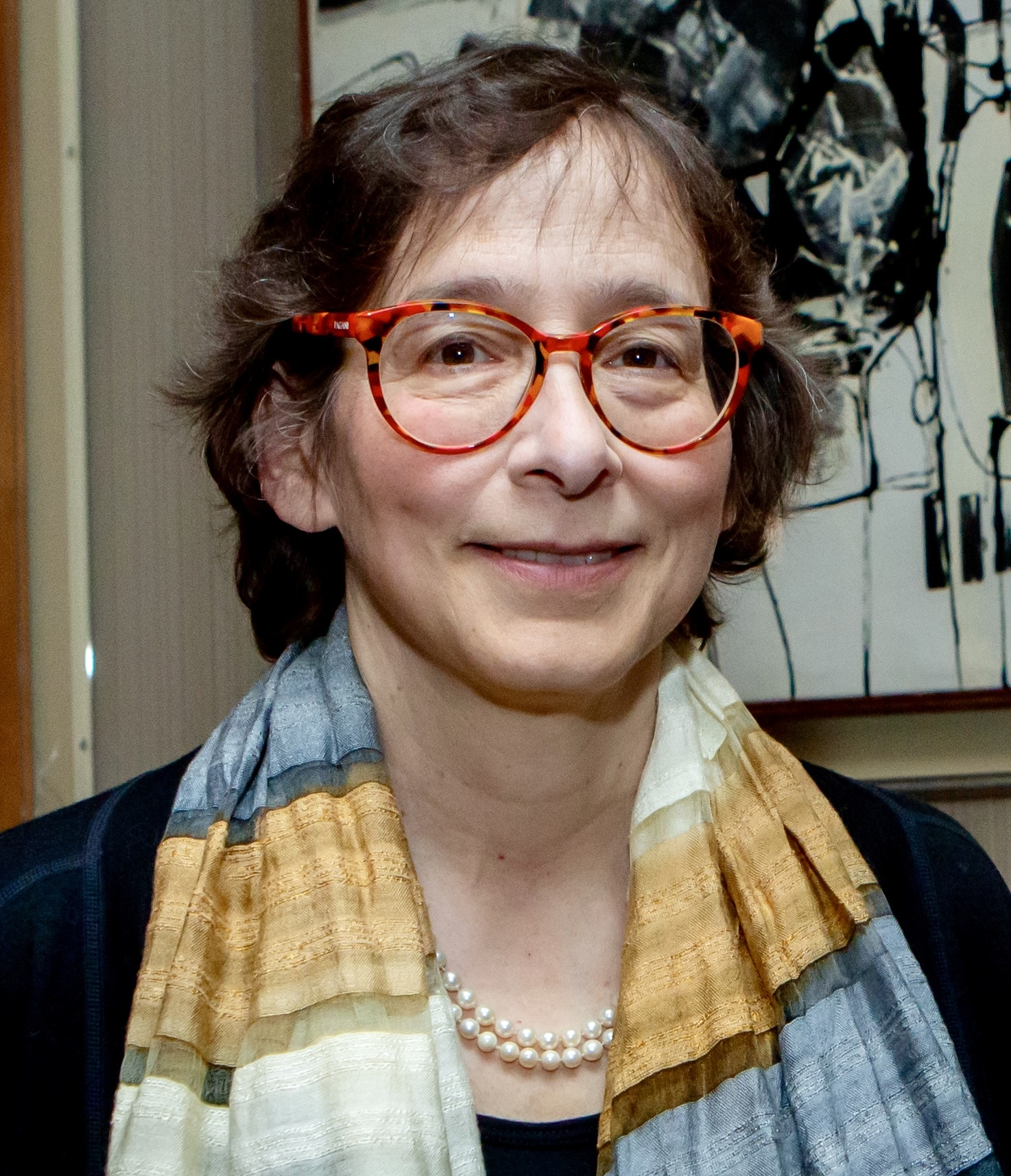
- Karlan at the Edmond J. Safra Center for Ethics in 2020
- Born: Pamela Susan Karlan; 1959 (age 66–67)
- Education: Yale University (BA, MA, JD)
- Occupation: American legal scholar
- Years active: 1984–present
- Partner: Viola Canales

Pamela Susan Karlan (born 1959) is an American legal scholar who was the principal deputy assistant attorney general in the Civil Rights Division of the United States Department of Justice from February 8, 2021, until July 1, 2022. She is a professor at Stanford Law School. A leading legal scholar on voting rights and constitutional law, she previously served as U.S. Deputy Assistant Attorney General for Voting Rights in the DOJ's Civil Rights Division from 2014 to 2015.

== Education ==
Karlan graduated from Yale University, where she received a B.A. in history in 1980, as well as an M.A. in history and J.D. in 1984. At Yale Law School, she served as an article and book reviews editor of the Yale Law Journal.

After graduation from law school, Karlan worked as a law clerk for then-U.S. District Judge Abraham David Sofaer of the Southern District of New York from 1984 to 1985. She went on to clerk for U.S. Supreme Court Justice Harry Blackmun the following year. In a 1995 oral history with Harold Koh, Blackmun revealed that his dissent in Bowers v. Hardwick had been written primarily by Karlan. He said that Karlan "did a lot of very effective writing, and I owe a lot to her and her ability in getting that dissent out. She felt very strongly about it, and I think is correct in her approach to it. I think the dissent is correct."

== Career ==
After her clerkships, Karlan worked as an assistant counsel at the NAACP Legal Defense and Educational Fund from 1986-88. From 1988-98, she taught law at the University of Virginia School of Law, where she won the All-University Outstanding Teaching Award in 1995–96 and the State Council of Higher Education for Virginia's Outstanding Faculty Award in 1997. In 1998, Karlan joined the faculty of Stanford Law School. She is the school's Kenneth and Harle Montgomery Professor of Public Interest Law. In 2004, Karlan cofounded the Stanford Supreme Court Litigation Clinic, through which students litigate live cases before the U.S. Supreme Court. In 2002, Karlan won the school's prestigious John Bingham Hurlbut Award for Excellence in Teaching.

On December 4, 2019, Karlan — alongside law professors Noah Feldman, Michael Gerhardt, and Jonathan Turley — testified before the House Judiciary Committee regarding the constitutional grounds for presidential impeachment in the Impeachment inquiry of President Donald Trump. She made a controversial statement delivered during the December 2019 impeachment hearing of President Trump, "Contrary to what President Trump has said, Article 2 [of the Constitution] does not give him the power to do anything he wants ... The Constitution says there can be no titles of nobility, so while the president can name his son Baron [sic], he can't make him a baron", having mistaken the spelling of Trump's youngest child's name (Barron). Karlan was condemned by Melania Trump and others for attacking a 13-year-old boy and apologized afterward.

Karlan is a member of the American Academy of Arts and Sciences, the American Academy of Appellate Lawyers, and the American Law Institute. On May 6, 2020, Facebook appointed her to its content oversight board, from which she resigned in February 2021 to join the Biden administration as Principal Deputy Assistant Attorney General at the Civil Rights Division of the Department of Justice.

=== Public service ===
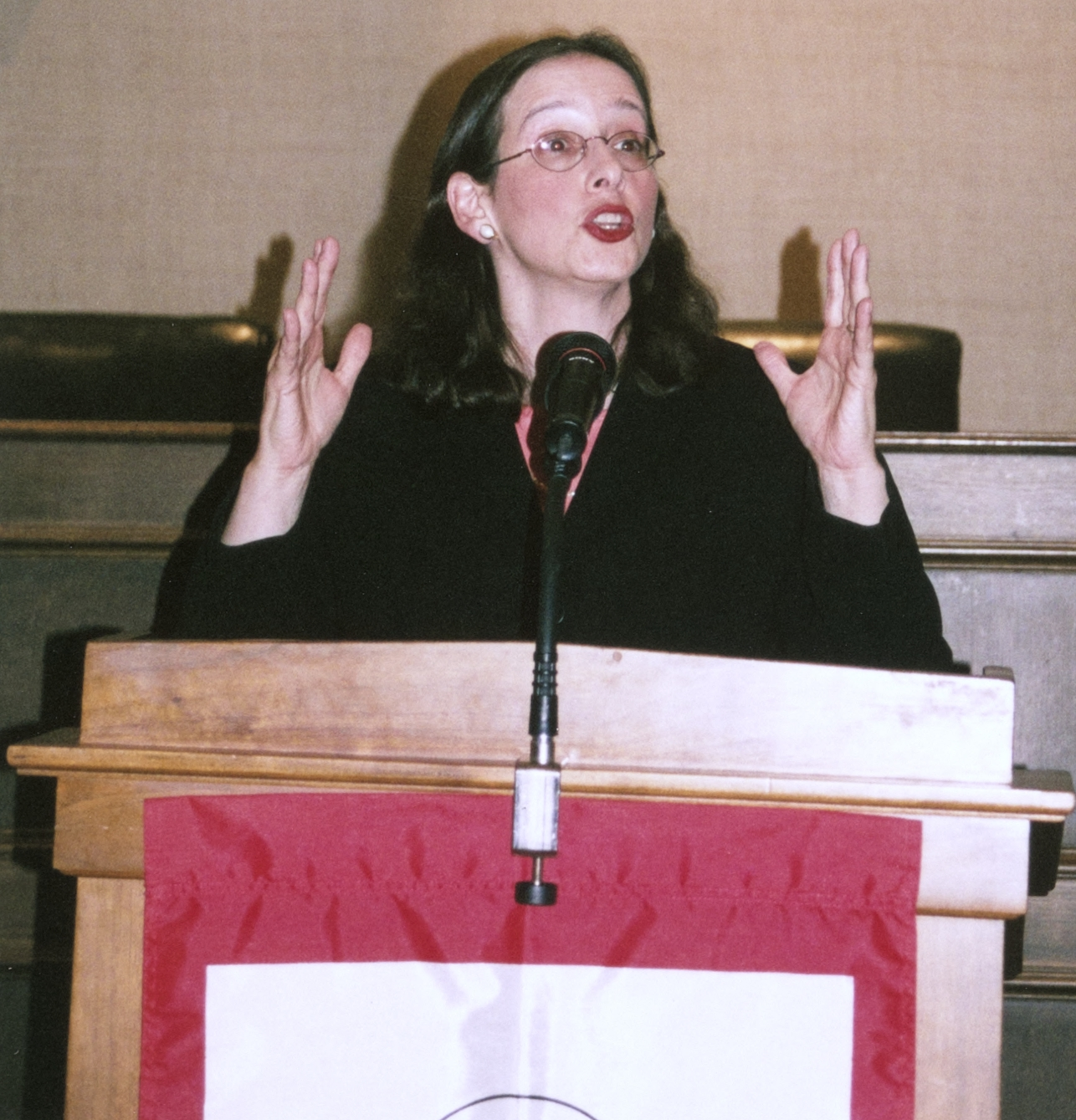
Karlan speaking at the University of Georgia School of Law in 2004

In 2003, she was appointed to the California Fair Political Practices Commission by Controller Steve Westly. Until 2005, she served as commissioner to help implement and enforce California's campaign finance, lobbying, and conflict of interest laws.

On December 20, 2013, Karlan was appointed by the Obama administration to serve as the U.S. Deputy Assistant Attorney General for Voting Rights in the United States Department of Justice Civil Rights Division. The position did not require confirmation by the U.S. Senate. Karlan took up her post on January 13, 2014, and served for one year. For her work in implementing the Supreme Court decision in United States v. Windsor, she received the Attorney General's Award for Exceptional Service, the DOJ's highest award for employee performance.

Throughout her career, Karlan has been an advocate before the U.S. Supreme Court. She was mentioned as a potential candidate to replace Supreme Court Justice David Souter when he retired in 2009.

In November 2020, Karlan was named a volunteer member of the Joe Biden presidential transition Agency Review Team to support transition efforts related to the United States Department of Justice.

In February 2021, Karlan was named a principal deputy assistant attorney general in the United States Department of Justice Civil Rights Division.

== Political views ==
Peter Baker, a The New York Times political writer, described Karlan as "a full-throated, unapologetic liberal torchbearer". Karlan has said that the United States should help Ukraine fight Russia so that the United States does not have to fight Russia on its own territory.

== Personal life ==
Karlan told Politico in 2009, "It's no secret at all that I'm counted among the LGBT crowd". She has described herself as an example of "snarky, bisexual, Jewish women". Her partner is writer Viola Canales.

== Works and publications ==
=== Selected books ===
- Karlan, Pamela S. (2013). A Constitution for All Times. Cambridge, MA: MIT Press. ISBN 978-0-262-01989-7. JSTOR j.ctt9qf8bs. OCLC 863038741.
- Issacharoff, Samuel; Karlan, Pamela S.; Pildes, Richard H.; Persily, Nathan (2016). The Law of Democracy: Legal Structure of the Political Process (5th ed.). St. Paul, MN: Foundation Pres. ISBN 9781628102253. OCLC 956640376.

=== Selected journal articles ===
- Brennan, William J.; Ginsburg, Ruth Bader; Arnold, Richard S.; Griswold, Erwin N.; Karlan, Pamela S.; Koh, Harold Hongju (1994). "A Tribute to Justice Harry A. Blackmun". Harvard Law Review. 108 (1): 163–8. ISSN 0017-811X. JSTOR 1341989. PMID 3333213.
- Karlan, Pamela S. (November 2009). "The Supreme Court – Comments. Electing Judges, Judging Elections, and the Lessons of Caperton" (PDF). Harvard Law Review. 123 (1): 80–103. ISSN 0017-811X. OCLC 472051099.
- Karlan, Pamela (Summer 2011). "Henry J. Miller Lecture Series: Old Reasons, New Reasons, No Reasons". Georgia State University Law Review. 27 (4). ISSN 8755-6847. OCLC 8092032473.
- Karlan, Pamela S. (June 2011). "In Memoriam: William J. Stuntz" (PDF). Harvard Law Review. 124 (8): 1841–1843.
- Karlan, Pamela (Spring 2019). "The Swing Justice: Reflections on the Career of Justice Anthony Kennedy. Panel 1: Abortion and Gay Rights". Georgia State University Law Review. 35 (5 (Supplement)): 871–905. ISSN 8755-6847. OCLC 1101178994.

== Supreme Court cases argued ==
- O'Connor-Ratcliff v. Garnier (2023)
- Bostock v. Clayton County (2019)
- Lozman v. City of Riviera Beach, Florida (2017)
- Dolan v. United States (2009)
- Herring v. United States (2008)
- Riley v. Kennedy (2007)
- Whitman v. Dep't of Transportation (2005)
- Rousey v. Jacoway (2004)
- Morse v. Republican Party of Virginia (1995)
- Chisom v. Roemer (1990)

== See also ==
- Barack Obama Supreme Court candidates
- Joe Biden Supreme Court candidates
- List of law clerks for the second seat of the Supreme Court of the United States
