= Voter suppression in the United States =

Efforts used to prevent eligible voters from voting

In the United States, voter suppression is a historical and present occurrence. Efforts to prevent people from exercising their right to vote vary by state, local government, precinct, and election. Voter suppression has historically been used for racial, economic, gender, age and disability discrimination. After the American Civil War, all African-American men were granted voting rights, but poll taxes or language tests were used to limit and suppress the ability to register or cast a ballot. The Civil Rights Act of 1964 and the Voting Rights Act of 1965 improved voting access.

In the 21st century, voter suppression takes varied forms, including voter ID mandates, restrictions on vote-by-mail, penalizing the provision of water and other sustenance to those waiting in line to vote, and gerrymandering to limit the effectiveness of a group’s votes. The 2013 US Supreme Court ruling of Shelby County v. Holder, which weakened the Voting Rights Act, has enabled substantial voter suppression. Historically and presently, instances of voter suppression are primarily driven by state-level efforts, rather than federal policymaking. Proponents of voter suppression efforts often justify their efforts by raising concerns over electoral integrity, while opponents argue that these constitute bad faith given the lack of voter fraud evidence in the United States.

== Suffrage ==
=== Black and Native American suffrage ===
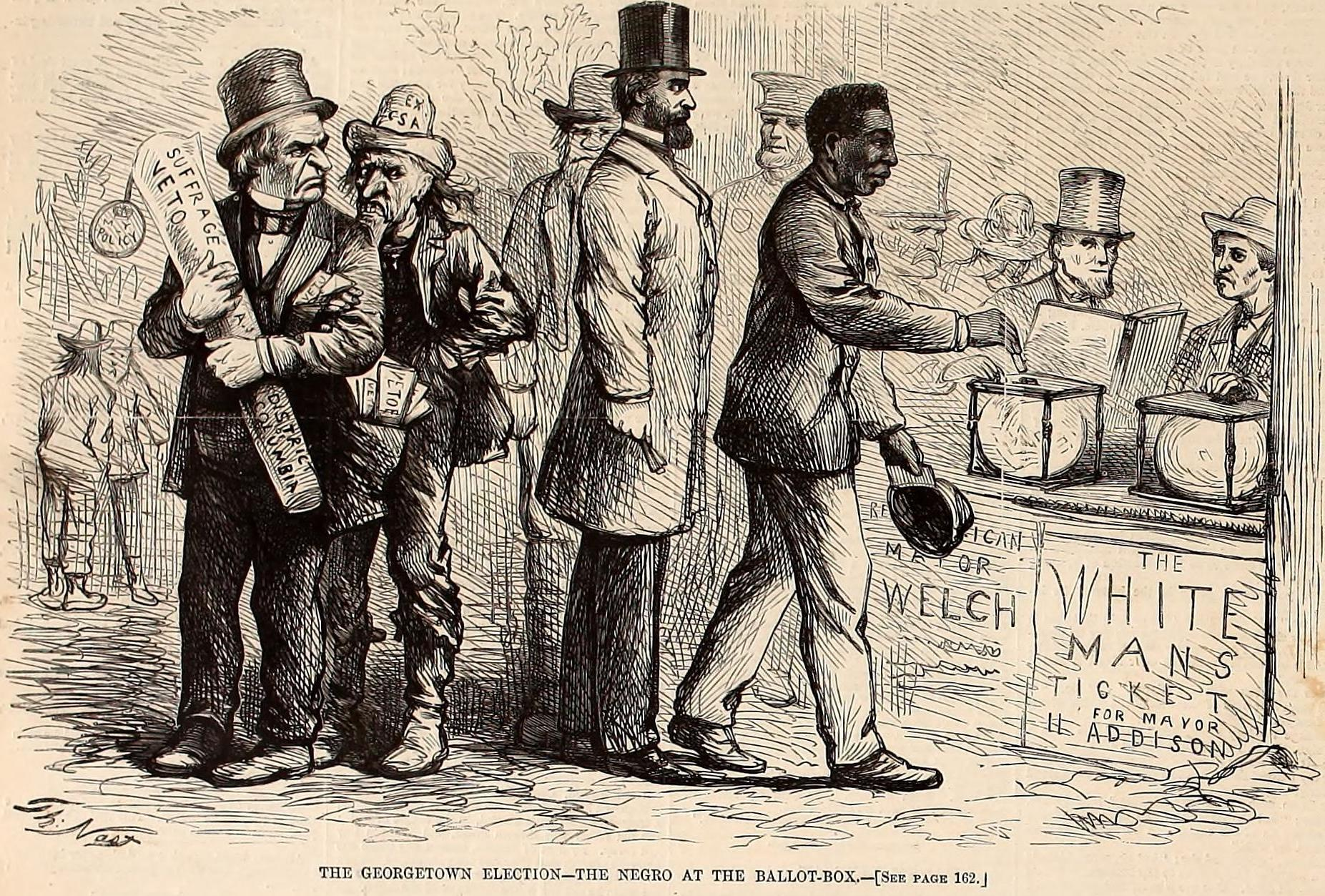
"The Georgetown elections - the Negro at the ballot-box." Cartoon by Thomas Nast, 1867.

The passage of the Fifteenth Amendment in 1870 guaranteed the right to vote to men of all races, including former slaves. Initially, this resulted in high voter turnout among African-Americans in the South. In the 1880 United States presidential election, a majority of eligible African-American voters cast a ballot in every Southern state except for two. In eight Southern states, Black turnout was equal to or greater than White turnout. At the end of the Reconstruction era, Southern states began implementing policies to suppress Black voters. After 1890, less than 9,000 of Mississippi's 147,000 eligible African-American voters were registered to vote, or about 6%. Louisiana went from 130,000 registered African-American voters in 1896 to 1,342 in 1904 (about a 99% decrease). Between the end of Reconstruction era and the passage of the Civil Rights Act of 1964, the rights of black voters were frequently infringed upon.

The decision on Cherokee Nation v. Georgia in 1831 meant that Native people would essentially not have a right to vote, until the passage of the 15th amendment, when certain ground was gained towards enfranchisement. Native Americans gained more ground with the passage of the Indian Citizenship Act of 1924.

==== Poll taxes ====
Poll taxes were used to disenfranchise voters, particularly African-Americans and poor whites in the South. Poll taxes started in the 1890s, requiring eligible voters to pay a fee before casting a ballot. Some poor whites were grandfathered in if they had an ancestor who voted before the Civil War era. This meant that they were exempt from paying the tax. Eleven Southern states (Alabama, Arkansas, Florida, Georgia, Louisiana, Mississippi, North Carolina, South Carolina, Tennessee, Texas, and Virginia), as well as several outside the South, imposed poll taxes. The poll tax mechanism varied on a state-by-state basis; in Alabama, the poll tax was cumulative, meaning that a man had to pay all poll taxes due from the age of twenty-one onward in order to vote. In other states, poll taxes had to be paid for several years before being eligible to vote. Enforcement of poll tax laws was patchy. Election officials had the discretion whether or not to ask for a voter's poll tax receipt.

The constitutionality of the poll tax was upheld by the Supreme Court in the 1937 Breedlove v. Suttles and again affirmed in 1951 by a federal court in Butler v. Thompson. Poll taxes began to wane in popularity despite judicial affirmations, with five Southern states keeping poll taxes by 1962 (Alabama, Arkansas, Mississippi, Texas, and Virginia). The poll tax was officially prohibited in 1964 by the Twenty-fourth Amendment.

==== Literacy tests ====
Like poll taxes, literacy tests were primarily used to disenfranchise poor or African-American voters in the South. African-American literacy rates lagged behind White literacy rates until 1940. Literacy tests were applied unevenly: property owners were often exempt, as well as those who would have had the right to vote (or whose ancestors had the right to vote) in 1867, which was before the passage of the Fifteenth Amendment. Some states exempted veterans of the Civil War from tests. Literacy tests varied in difficulty, with African-Americans often given more rigorous tests. In Macon County, Alabama in the late 1950s, for example, at least twelve whites who had not finished elementary school passed the literacy test, while several college-educated African-Americans were failed. Literacy tests were prevalent outside the South as well, as they were seen as keeping society's undesirables (the poor, immigrants, or the uninformed) from voting; twenty states still had literacy tests after World War II, including seven Southern states, California, Connecticut, Massachusetts, and New York. A 1970 Amendment to the Voting Rights Act prohibited the use of literacy tests for determining voting eligibility.

=== Women's suffrage ===
Momentum for women's suffrage in the United States started in the 1840s. Organizations began in 1869 and eventually merged in 1890 as the National American Woman Suffrage Association (NAWSA) with Susan B. Anthony as its leading force. Suffragists made several attempts to vote in the early 1870s in hopes to convince the United States Supreme Court to give women the right to vote. The group fought for suffrage on a state-by-state basis. At the turn of the 19th century, Carrie Chapman Catt prioritized leading the two-million-member NAWSA to advocate for a constitutional amendment giving women the right to vote. After a series of votes in Congress and in state legislatures, the Nineteenth Amendment was ratified on August 18, 1920. The amendment states, "The right of citizens of the United States to vote shall not be denied or abridged by the United States or by any State on account of sex."

=== Youth suffrage ===
The twenty-sixth Amendment to the United States Constitution created a floor where anyone 18 years or older could vote, but gave states and localities the option to extend the franchise by lowering the voting age to even younger citizens.

=== Suffrage of the elderly and disabled ===
Suffrage for Americans with disabilities & Voting Accessibility for the Elderly and Handicapped Act

== Types of voter suppression ==
Voter suppression can take illegal forms such as voter intimidation, coercion or threats. Scholar Michael Smith, a professor of political science at Emporia State University, writes that Democratic Party-aligned activists also describe state laws that make it more difficult to vote as amounting to voter suppression: "While Republicans cry voter fraud, Democrats counter by charging voter suppression. The true cause of these new laws, they argue, is not to curb voter fraud, which study after study has shown to be extraordinarily rare. Instead, Democrats say, the true goal is voter suppression."

=== Purging of eligible voters from the rolls ===
==== Database matching ====
In 1998, Florida created the Florida Central Voter File with the stated purpose of combatting vote fraud documented in the 1997 Miami mayoral election. At least 1,100 people (~2x than the margin of victory) were wrongly purged from voter registration lists in Florida ahead of the 2000 election because their names were similar to those of convicted felons, who were not allowed to vote at that time under Florida law. According to the Palm Beach Post, African-Americans accounted for 88% of those removed from the rolls through this effort but were only about 11% of Florida's voters. However, according to the Florida Department of Law Enforcement, nearly 89% of felons convicted in Florida were black at the time; therefore, a purge of convicted felons could be expected to include a disproportionately high number of blacks. The Post added that "a review of state records, internal e-mails of DBT employees and testimony before the civil rights commission and an elections task force showed no evidence that minorities were specifically targeted."

In 2008, more than 98,000 registered Georgia voters were removed from the roll of voters because of discrepancies in computer records of their identification information. Some 4,500 voters had to prove their citizenship to regain their right to vote. Georgia was challenged for requesting more Social Security-based verifications than any other state—about 2 million voters in total. An attorney involved in the lawsuit said that since the letters were mailed within 90 days of the election, Georgia violated federal law. The director of the ACLU's Georgia Voting Rights Project said, "They are systematically using these lists and matching them and using those matches to send these letters out to voters. They're using a systematic purging procedure that's expressly prohibited by federal laws, if people who are properly eligible are getting improperly challenged and purged." Elise Shore, a regional attorney for the Mexican American Legal Defense and Educational Fund (MALDEF), agreed the letters appear to violate two federal laws against voter purging within 90 days of the election. "People are being targeted, and people are being told they are non-citizens, including both naturalized citizens and U.S.-born citizens," said Shore. "They're being told they're not eligible to vote, based on information in a database that hasn't been checked and approved by the Department of Justice (DOJ), and that we know has flaws in it." Secretary of State Karen Handel denied that the removal of voters' names was an instance of voter suppression.

In 2024, more than three thousand people were stripped of their voter registration in Alabama after they were identified as having a "noncitizen identification numbers by the Department of Homeland Security". Only a fraction of them are confirmed as ineligible to vote, with the majority of them flagged because they received their driver's license or ID as a foreign national which are valid for eight years regardless of these individuals are later naturalized. More than 700 individuals are confirmed as having citizenship and eligible to vote.

==== Caging lists ====
Caging lists have been used by political parties to challenge potential voters registered with other political parties. A political party sends first-class mail marked "do not forward" to addresses of registered voters. If the mail is returned as undeliverable, the mailing organization uses that fact to challenge the registration, arguing that because the voter could not be reached at the address, the voter should be removed from the list of registered voters. If this challenge is made at the polls on Election Day, a challenged voter might have to vote a provisional ballot.

==== Purges conducted by staff ====
Between November 2015 and early 2016, over 120,000 voters were dropped from rolls in Brooklyn, New York. Officials stated that the purge was a mistake and that those dropped represented a "broad cross-section" of the electorate. A WNYC analysis found that the purge had disproportionately affected majority-Hispanic districts. The board reinstated all voters in time for the 2016 congressional primary. The Board of Elections subsequently suspended the Republican appointee connected to the purge, but kept on her Democratic counterpart.

=== Hurdles to casting a vote ===
==== Limitations on early and absentee voting ====
In North Carolina, Republican lawmakers requested data on various voting practices, broken down by race. They then passed laws that restricted voting and registration many ways that disproportionately affected African Americans, including cutting back on early voting. In a 2016 appellate court case, the U.S. Court of Appeals for the Fourth Circuit struck down a law that removed the first week of early voting. The court held that the GOP used the data they gathered to remove the first week of early voting because more African American voters voted during that week, and African American voters were more likely to vote for Democrats. Between 2008 and 2012 in North Carolina, 70% of African American voters voted early. After cuts to early voting, African American turnout in early voting was down by 8.7% (around 66,000 votes) in North Carolina.

==== Identification requirements ====
Some states have imposed photo ID requirements, which critics claim are intended to depress the turnout of minority voters. It has been explored whether or not photo ID laws disproportionately affect non-white voters and those of lower income: 8% of White Americans lack driver's licenses, for example, compared to 25% of African-American citizens. For driver's licenses that are unexpired where the stated address and name exactly match the voter registration record, 16% of White Americans lack a valid license, compared to 27% of Latinos and 37% for African Americans. In July 2016, a federal appeals court found that a 2011 Texas voter ID law discriminated against black and Hispanic voters because only a few types of ID were allowed; for example, military IDs and concealed carry permits were allowed, but state employee photo IDs and university photo IDs were not. In August 2017, an updated version of the same Texas voter ID law was found unconstitutional in federal district court; the district judge indicated that one potential remedy for the discrimination would be to order Texas election-related laws to be pre-cleared by the U.S. Department of Justice (DOJ). The court also ruled that the law would force some voters to spend money traveling to a government office to update their identification information; the court compared this provision to a poll tax.

The ability to use student ID for election purposes was restricted in Wisconsin and North Carolina – states with Republican-controlled governments. This is likely motivated by the fact that students tend to vote more for Democrats relative to the general population.

Studies exploring the disparate impacts of voter id laws have reached mixed conclusions. A 2019 paper by University of Bologna and Harvard Business School economists found that voter ID laws had "no negative effect on registration or turnout, overall or for any group defined by race, gender, age, or party affiliation." A 2019 study in the journal Electoral Studies found that the implementation of voter ID laws in South Carolina reduced overall turnout but did not have a disparate impact. 2019 studies in Political Science Quarterly and the Atlantic Economic Journal found no evidence that voter ID laws have a disproportionate influence on minorities, while other studies show differently. In Fish v. Kobach, Judge Julie Robinson, who had been appointed to the bench by President George W. Bush, noted that the Kansas Documentary Proof of Citizenship law illegally denied 12.4% of new voter registration applications, over 31,000 US citizens, during the period covered by data considered in that case.

==== Excessive lines when voting ====
It is possible to increase the queue lengths in certain wards, which dissuades voting, because of the length of time waiting in the queue before being able to vote. To achieve a long line, per queueing theory, the rate at which the queue has arrivals needs to be higher than the rate at which the queue is serviced. Techniques used to achieve this lower rate of service include limiting the number of voting machines, based on ward, or challenging voters excessively in certain wards. Both these techniques were identified as influential in The Conyers Report On The 2004 Presidential Election.

The tactic of using too few voting machines to increase lines, as referenced in the Conyers Report, cited a Washington Post piece which exemplified Franklin County, Ohio. In an analysis of this county, wards with many machines per voter were showing Bush majorities, and the wards with relatively few machines per voter were typically in favour of Kerry. The numbers disenfranchised statewide by this tactic were in the 10s of thousands or 100s of thousands of voters.

If people still remain in the queue at the time the poll closes, they should not be turned away. Often it is the case that provisional ballots are handed out to those who were still in the queue at the time poll closes. There have, however, been cases where around 1/3 of the provisional ballots were rejected, with no clear guidelines for acceptability.

=== False information ===
==== Voting procedure disinformation ====
Voting procedure disinformation involves giving voters false information about when and how to vote, leading them to fail to cast valid ballots.

For example, in recall elections for the Wisconsin State Senate in 2011, Americans for Prosperity, a conservative political advocacy group founded in 2004 by brothers Charles and David Koch to support Republican candidates and causes in the United States, sent many Democratic voters a mailing that gave an incorrect deadline for returning absentee ballots. Voters who relied on the deadline in the mailing could have sent in their ballots too late for them to be counted. The organization claimed that it was caused by a typographical error.

Just prior to the 2018 elections, The New York Times warned readers of numerous types of deliberate misinformation, sometimes targeting specific voter demographics. These types of disinformation included false information about casting ballots online by email and by text message, the circulation of doctored photographs in 2016 which claimed Immigration and Customs Enforcement (ICE) agents were arresting voters at polling places and included threatening language meant to intimidate Latino voters, polling place hoaxes, disinformation on remote voting options, suspicious texts, voting machine malfunction rumors, misleading photos and videos, and false voter fraud allegations. The Times added that messages purportedly sent by Trump to voters in Indiana, Kansas, Michigan, and Georgia were actually disseminated from Republican organizations. In 2018, Trump actually spread information about defective machines in a single Utah county, giving the impression that such difficulties were occurring nationwide.

In the 2024 elections, progressive organization AllVote sent misleading texts to thousands of Pennsylvania voters telling them they had already voted, which they claimed was a copy editing error. The Wisconsin Elections Commission also criticized the group for sending thousands of Wisconsin voters a link to the wrong election website. AllVote has distributed misleading or false election-related information on multiple occasions, and has been flagged by state officials across the country as a scam.

==== Candidate impersonation ====
A type of voter suppression is political operatives sending texts, calls or videos that impersonate a candidate and give voters false information, such as that the candidate had dropped out. In the 2020 United States House of Representatives elections in Florida, fake texts and a YouTube video were sent out claiming to be from 19th district Republican primary candidate Byron Donalds, in which he falsely said he was dropping out. A similar instance happened to Julie Fedorchak in the Republican primary for the 2024 United States House of Representatives election in North Dakota. In the 2024 New Hampshire Democratic presidential primary, robocalls falsely claiming to be from Joe Biden were made urging voters to stay home and "save their vote" for the general election. Deep fake videos created by artificial intelligence have been noted to further contribute to this problem.

=== Election timing ===
Public interest, media coverage, and therefore voter turnout have historically been the lowest during odd-numbered "off-years" when there are rarely any races to a federal office, very few gubernatorial and state legislative elections, and instead the vast majority of races are held at the local level. The political calculations of incumbent politicians appears to be the most common thread over the years guiding decisions around election timing for the few states with off-year elections. In the 19th Century, Mississippi and Kentucky were among the states that originally scheduled their races during the off-year elections because it was less likely there would be federal oversight, and therefore nobody who would enforce any federal election or voting rights law. Deliberately scheduling local races during the off-years when more people are willing to skip going to the polls may also benefit well-organized special interest groups that often make up local political machines, making it easier for their favored candidates to capture more of a government.

== Historical examples ==
=== 1838 Gallatin County Election Day Battle ===
William Peniston, a candidate for the Missouri state legislature, made disparaging statements about the Mormons and warned them not to vote in the election. Reminding Daviess County residents of the growing electoral power of the Mormon community, Peniston made a speech in Gallatin claiming that if the Missourians "suffer such men as these [Mormons] to vote, you will soon lose your suffrage." Around 200 non-Mormons gathered in Gallatin on election day to prevent Mormons from voting.

When about 30 Latter Day Saints approached the polling place, a Missourian named Dick Weldon declared that Mormons were not allowed to vote in Clay County. One of the Mormons present, Samuel Brown, claimed that Peniston's statements were false and then declared his intention to vote. This triggered a brawl between the bystanders. The Mormons called upon the Danites, a Mormon vigilante group, and the Missourians left the scene to obtain guns and ammunition and swore to kill the Mormons.

Rumors among both parties spread that there were casualties in the conflict. When Joseph Smith and volunteers rode to Adam-ondi-Ahman to assess the situation, they discovered there were no truths to the rumors.

=== Jim Crow laws ===
Jim Crow laws were state and local laws that enforced racial segregation in the Southern United States. All were enacted in the late 19th and early 20th centuries by white Democratic-dominated state legislatures after the Reconstruction period. The laws were enforced until 1965. The origin of the phrase "Jim Crow" has often been attributed to "Jump Jim Crow", a song-and-dance caricature of blacks performed by white actor Thomas D. Rice in blackface, which first surfaced in 1832 and was used to satirize Andrew Jackson's populist policies. As a result of Rice's fame, "Jim Crow" by 1838 had become a pejorative expression meaning "Negro". When southern legislatures passed laws of racial segregation directed against blacks at the end of the 19th century, these statutes became known as Jim Crow laws.

During the Reconstruction period of 1865–1877, federal laws provided civil rights protections in the U.S. South for freedmen, the African Americans who had formerly been slaves, and the minority of blacks who had been free before the war. In the 1870s, Democrats gradually regained power in the Southern legislatures, having used insurgent paramilitary groups, such as the White League and the Red Shirts, to disrupt Republican organizing, run Republican officeholders out of town, and intimidate blacks to suppress their voting.

In 1877, a national Democratic Party compromise to gain Southern support in the presidential election (a corrupt bargain) resulted in the government's withdrawing the last of the federal troops from the South. White Democrats had regained political power in every Southern state.

Blacks were still elected to local offices throughout the 1880s, but their voting was suppressed for state and national elections. Democrats passed laws to make voter registration and electoral rules more restrictive, with the result that political participation by most blacks and many poor whites began to decrease. Between 1890 and 1910, ten of the eleven former Confederate states, starting with Mississippi, passed new constitutions or amendments that effectively disenfranchised most blacks and tens of thousands of poor whites through a combination of poll taxes, literacy and comprehension tests, and residency and record-keeping requirements. By the 1940s there were presidential, congressional, Senate, state, and local elections held in the South states with less than 5% of the area's eligible voting population participating, or with the no votes cast against a victorious candidate.

Voter turnout dropped drastically through the South as a result of such measures. In Louisiana, by 1900, black voters were reduced to 5,320 on the rolls, although they comprised the majority of the state's population. By 1910, only 730 blacks were registered, less than 0.5% of eligible black men. "In 27 of the state's 60 parishes, not a single black voter was registered any longer; in 9 more parishes, only one black voter was." The cumulative effect in North Carolina meant that black voters were eliminated from voter rolls during the period from 1896 to 1904. The growth of their thriving middle class was slowed. In North Carolina and other Southern states, blacks suffered from being made invisible in the political system: "[W]ithin a decade of disfranchisement, the white supremacy campaign had erased the image of the black middle class from the minds of white North Carolinians." In Alabama tens of thousands of poor whites were also disenfranchised, although initially legislators had promised them they would not be affected adversely by the new restrictions.

In some cases, progressive measures ostensibly intended to reduce election fraud, such as the Eight Box Law in South Carolina, acted against black and white voters who were illiterate, as they could not follow the directions. While the separation of African Americans from the white general population was becoming legalized and formalized during the Progressive Era (1890s–1920s), it was also becoming customary. For instance, even in cases in which Jim Crow laws did not expressly forbid black people to participate in sports or recreation, a segregated culture had become common.

The Voting Rights Act of 1965, passed by huge bipartisan majorities in both houses of Congress and signed by President Lyndon Johnson, aimed to end these practices. A key provision of the act required that states with a history of disenfranchising black voters, namely those in the Jim Crow South, submit to the Department of Justice for "pre-clearance" any proposed changes to state voting laws. This provision was overturned by the Supreme Court in the case of Shelby County v. Holder (2013). In her dissenting opinion, Justice Ruth Bader Ginsburg argued, “Throwing out preclearance when it has worked and is continuing to work to stop discriminatory changes is like throwing away your umbrella in a rainstorm because you are not getting wet."

==== 1980s ====
In 1980, Republican Christian Conservative leader Paul Weyrich said, "I don't want everybody to vote. ... our leverage in the elections ... goes up as the voting populace goes down."

In 1981 and 1986, the Republican National Committee (RNC) sent out letters to African-American neighborhoods. When tens of thousands of them were returned undeliverable, the party successfully challenged the voters and had them deleted from voting rolls. The violation of the Voting Rights Act got the RNC taken to court by the Democratic National Committee (DNC). As a result of the case, the RNC entered a consent decree, which prohibited the party from engaging in anti-fraud initiatives that targeted minorities from conducting mail campaigns to "compile voter challenge lists."

== 2000s ==
=== 2002 New Hampshire Senate election phone jamming scandal ===
In the 2002 New Hampshire Senate election phone jamming scandal, Republican officials attempted to reduce the number of Democratic voters by paying professional telemarketers in Idaho to make repeated hang-up calls to the telephone numbers used by the Democratic Party's ride-to-the-polls phone lines on election day. By tying up the lines, voters seeking rides from the Democratic Party would have more difficulty reaching the party to ask for transportation to and from their polling places.

=== 2004 presidential election ===
Allegations surfaced in several states that a private group, Voters Outreach of America, which had been empowered by the individual states, had collected and submitted Republican voter registration forms while inappropriately discarding voter registration forms where the new voter had chosen to register with the Democratic Party. Such people would believe they had registered to vote, and would only discover on election day that they were not registered and could not cast a ballot.

Michigan Republican state legislator John Pappageorge was quoted as saying, "If we do not suppress the Detroit vote, we're going to have a tough time in this election."

Similarly, in Ohio, issues were highlighted in a report by ranking chair of the House Judiciary Committee John Conyers. A federal court found that some of the voter suppression tactics used by Ken Blackwell were illegal, and against the Help America Vote Act. The report also identified attempts to dissuade voters, by having long queues in those wards which were leaning towards Kerry. Tactics employed included reducing the number of voting machines in those wards, and excessive challenging of voters. It was estimated that tens- or hundreds of thousands of voters were suppressed in these ways, which is comparable by the margin of victory for Bush in that state.

In 2006, four employees of candidate John Kerry's campaign were convicted of slashing the tires of 25 vans rented by the Wisconsin state Republican Party which were to be used for driving Republican voters and monitors to the polls on Election Day 2004. They received jail terms of four to six months. At the campaign workers' sentencing, Judge Michael B. Brennan told the defendants, "Voter suppression has no place in our country. Your crime took away that right to vote for some citizens."

=== 2006 Virginia Senate election ===
During the Virginia U.S. Senate election, Secretary of the Virginia State Board of Elections Jean Jensen concluded that incidents of voter suppression appeared widespread and deliberate. Documented incidents of voter suppression include:

- Democratic voters receiving calls incorrectly informing them voting will lead to arrest.
- Widespread calls fraudulently claiming to be "[Democratic Senate candidate Jim] Webb Volunteers," falsely telling voters their voting location had changed.
- Fliers paid for by the Republican Party, stating "SKIP THIS ELECTION" that allegedly attempted to suppress African-American turnout.

The FBI has since launched an investigation into the suppression attempts. Despite the allegations, Democrat Jim Webb narrowly defeated incumbent George Allen.

=== 2008 presidential election ===
==== Michigan ====
On September 16, 2008, attorneys for then-Democratic presidential candidate Barack Obama announced their intention to seek an injunction to stop an alleged caging scheme in Michigan. It was alleged that the Michigan Republican Party used home foreclosure lists to challenge voters who used their foreclosed homes as their primary addresses at the polls. Michigan GOP officials called the suit "desperate". The Democratic party eventually dropped the case, instead accepting a non-legally binding public agreement from the Michigan GOP to not engage in foreclosure-based voter challenges.

On October 30, 2008, a federal appeals court ordered the reinstatement of 5,500 voters wrongly purged from the voter rolls by the state, in response to an ACLU of Michigan lawsuit which questioned the legality of a Michigan state law requiring local clerks to nullify the registrations of newly registered voters whenever their voter identification cards are returned by the post office as undeliverable.

==== Minnesota ====
The conservative nonprofit Minnesota Majority reportedly made phone calls claiming that the Minnesota Secretary of State had concerns about the validity of voters' registration. Their actions were referred to the Ramsey County attorney's office.

==== Pennsylvania ====
On Election Day 2008, at a polling station in Philadelphia, Pennsylvania, two members of the New Black Panther Party (NBPP)—Minister King Samir Shabazz and Jerry Jackson—stood in front of the entrance to a polling station in uniforms that have been described as military or paramilitary. Shabazz carried a billy club, and was reported to have pointed it at voters and shouted racial slurs, including phrases such as "white devil" and "you're about to be ruled by the black man, cracker". The incident drew the attention of police, who around 10:00 am, sent Shabazz away, in part because of his billy club. Jackson was allowed to stay because he was a certified poll watcher and was not accused of intimidation. Stephen Robert Morse, upon arriving at the scene, filmed Shabazz. The incident gained national attention after the video was uploaded to YouTube and went viral with over a million views. The Philadelphia incident became known as the New Black Panther Party voter intimidation case.

No complaints were filed by voters about the incident, though poll watchers witnessed some voters approach the polls and then turn away, apparently in response to the NBPP members. Nevertheless, the Bush administration's Department of Justice (DOJ) became aware of the incident and started an inquiry. In January 2009, less than two weeks before the Bush administration left office, Christopher Coates of the DOJ's Civil Rights Division filed a civil suit under the Voting Rights Act against four defendants, including Shabazz. There was no evidence that Shabazz's actions were directed or incited by the party or its national leader. Although none of the defendants challenged the lawsuit, the Obama administration dropped its claims against all but Shabazz in May 2009.

In response to the controversy, the NBPP suspended its Philadelphia chapter and repudiated Minister King Shabazz in a posting at its website. In December 2010, the Civil Rights Commission released a report concluding that their investigations had uncovered "numerous specific examples of open hostility and opposition" within the Obama DOJ to pursue cases in which whites were victims. The report accused the DOJ of failing to cooperate with investigations into its reason for dropping the case.

==== Wisconsin ====
The Republican Party attempted to have all 60,000 voters in the heavily Democratic city of Milwaukee who had registered since January 1, 2006 deleted from the voter rolls. The requests were rejected by the Milwaukee Election Commission, although Republican commissioner Bob Spindell voted in favor of deletion.

== 2010s ==
=== Maryland ===
In the Maryland gubernatorial election in 2010, the campaign of Republican candidate Bob Ehrlich hired a consultant who advised that "the first and most desired outcome is voter suppression", in the form of having "African-American voters stay home." To that end, the Republicans placed thousands of Election Day robocalls to Democratic voters, telling them that the Democratic candidate, Martin O'Malley, had won, although in fact the polls were still open for some two more hours. The Republicans' call, worded to seem as if it came from Democrats, told the voters, "Relax. Everything's fine. The only thing left is to watch it on TV tonight." The calls reached 112,000 voters in majority-African American areas. In 2011, Ehrlich's campaign manager, Paul Schurick, was convicted of fraud and other charges because of the calls. In 2012, he was sentenced to 30 days of home detention, a one-year suspended jail sentence, and 500 hours of community service over the four years of his probation, with no fine or jail time. The Democratic candidate won by a margin of more than 10 percent.

In 2015, Maryland's Montgomery County, Republicans planned to move two early-voting sites from densely populated Bethesda and Burtonsville to more sparsely populated areas in Brookeville and Potomac. They claimed to be aiming for more "geographic diversity"; Democrats accused them of trying to suppress the vote. The Burtonsville site had the most minority voters of all the early-voting sites in the county, while the proposed new locations were in more Republican-friendly areas with fewer minority residents. The Republican election board chairman admitted at a County Council committee that he and two GOP colleagues held a conference call with the chairman of Montgomery's Republican Party Central Committee. They said the call, from which Democrats were excluded, was legal. Democrats called it a violation of Maryland's Open Meetings Act. Todd Eberly, a political science professor from Saint Mary's College, called the claim by the Republicans, "a stupid defense."

=== 2016 presidential election ===
The 2016 presidential election was the first in 50 years without all the protections of the original Voting Rights Act. Fourteen states had new voting restrictions in place, including swing states such as Virginia and Wisconsin.

==== Kansas ====
In early 2016, a state judge struck down a law requiring voters to show proof of citizenship in cases where the voter had used a national voter registration form. In May, a federal judge ordered the state of Kansas to begin registering approximately 18,000 voters whose registrations had been delayed because they had not shown proof of citizenship. Kansas secretary of state Kris Kobach ordered that the voters be registered, but not for state and local elections. In July, a county judge struck down Kobach's order. Kobach has been repeatedly sued by the American Civil Liberties Union (ACLU) for allegedly trying to restrict voting rights in Kansas.

In particular, Fish v. Kobach was filed in 2016 and heard in the United States District Court for the District of Kansas in 2018 by Chief District Judge Julie A. Robinson; she had been appointed to the bench by President George W. Bush, a Republican. She found that Kobach's Documentary Proof of Citizenship law had illegally refused to accept 12.4% of new voter registration applications by US citizens while it was in effect, over 31,000 people, to protect the "integrity" of elections from the threat of votes by 39 non-citizens who had registered to vote. Moreover, the "voting rate among purported noncitizen registrations on [a Kansas temporary drivers license] match list is around 1%, whereas the voting rate among registrants in Kansas more generally is around 70%." She also noted that Hans von Spakovsky, whom Kobach called as an expert witness, had made multiple misleading statements, including claiming that a U.S. GAO study 'found that up to 3 percent of the 30,000 individuals called for jury duty from voter registration roles over a two-year period in just one U.S. district court were not U.S. citizens.' On cross-examination, however, he acknowledged that the GAO study contained information on 8 district courts, 4 of which had reported zero non-citizen called for jury duty, and the other 3 reported that less than 1% of those called for jury duty from voter rolls were noncitizens.

==== North Carolina ====
In 2013, the state House passed a bill that requires voters to show a photo ID issued by North Carolina, a passport, or a military identification card to begin in 2016. Out-of-state drivers licenses were to be accepted only if the voter registered within 90 days of the election, and university photo identification was not acceptable. In July 2016, a three-judge panel of the Fourth Circuit Court of Appeals reversed a trial court decision in a number of consolidated actions and struck down the law's photo ID requirement, finding that the new voting provisions targeted African Americans "with almost surgical precision," and that the legislators had acted with clear "discriminatory intent" in enacting strict election rules, shaping the rules based on data they received about African-American registration and voting patterns. On May 15, 2017, the U.S. Supreme Court declined to review the Appeals Court ruling.

==== North Dakota ====
North Dakota abolished voter registration in 1951 for state and federal elections, the only state to do so. It has since 2004 required voters to produce an approved form of ID before being able to vote, one of which was a tribe ID commonly used by Native Americans. However, it was common and lawful for a post office box to be used on this ID instead of a residential address. This has led to North Dakota being accused of voter suppression because many Native American were being denied a vote because they did not have an approved form of ID with a residential address.

North Dakota's ID law especially adversely affected large numbers of Native Americans, with almost a quarter of Native Americans in the state, otherwise eligible to vote, being denied a vote on the basis that they do not have proper ID; compared to 12% of non-Indians. A judge overturned the ID law in July 2016, also saying: "The undisputed evidence before the Court reveals that voter fraud in North Dakota has been virtually non-existent." However, the denial of a vote on this basis was also an issue in the 2018 mid-term election.

In the run-up to North Dakota's election for U.S. Senate in 2018, state lawmakers implemented changes to voter identification rules, citing nine "suspected" double voting cases. Under the new rules, voter IDs had to include a residential address, rather than a post office box. The change led to rebuke and lawsuits from Native American voters on a Turtle Mountain Chippewa reservation, as well as claims of partisanship from then-Senator Heidi Heitkamp, a Democrat, as the law was championed by Republican state representatives. The voters claimed discrimination, and in legal filings cited a survey that indicated 18% of Native Americans lacked a valid ID due to the new street address requirement, while the requirement only affected 10.9% of non-Natives. The survey pinned the discrepancy on higher poverty rates and lower transportation access in areas with higher proportions of Native Americans. The legal battle quickly rose to national attention. While former Attorney General Eric Holder called the rule "nothing more than voter suppression", North Dakota House Majority Leader Republican Al Carlson, who sponsored the law, said "Our attempt was never to disenfranchise anybody. From a legislative standpoint, we wanted the integrity ... in the ballots, but we also want to have anybody that wants to vote that is a legal citizen be able to identify where they live and be able to vote." Ultimately, the legal battle ended when the Supreme Court declined to hear an appeal in November 2018, which effectively left the rule in place. In July 2019, the ID law was judged to be constitutional. A settlement of the dispute was reached in February 2020.

==== Ohio ====
Since 1994, Ohio has had a policy of purging infrequent voters from the rolls. In April 2016, a lawsuit was filed, challenging this policy on the grounds that it violated the National Voter Registration Act of 1993 (NVRA) and the Help America Vote Act of 2002. In June, the federal district court ruled for the plaintiffs, and entered a preliminary injunction applicable only to the November 2016 election. The preliminary injunction was upheld in September by the Court of Appeals for the Sixth Circuit. Had it not been upheld, thousands of voters would have been purged from the rolls just a few weeks before the election.

On June 11, 2018, the Supreme Court ruled that Ohio could continue its voting rolls purging thus reversing the 2016 Supreme Court ruling. The New York Times article "Supreme Court Upholds Purge of Ohio Voters", writes that for the state of Ohio, if a voter does not vote in a federal election, they will be sent a notice, if they do not respond to the notice and do not vote in the next four years, they will be removed from the voter rolls. Other states with the "Use it or lost it" type policy vary in notice response times and how many elections can be "missed." According to the Times article, Justice Samuel A. Alito Jr. who was writing on behave of the majority, penned that this move is to encourage states to "clean up their voting rolls" that may contain invalid and/or inaccurate voter registrations. In the USA Today article, "Supreme Court Says States Can Remove Voters Who Skip Elections, ignore warnings", Justice Stephen Breyer wrote a counter statement, referencing past forms of voter suppression and stating the ruling "erects needless hurdles to voting of the kind Congress sought to eliminate."

==== Wisconsin ====
Wisconsin has enforced a photo ID law for all elections since April 7, 2015. A federal judge found that Wisconsin's restrictive voter ID law led to "real incidents of disenfranchisement, which undermine rather than enhance confidence in elections, particularly in minority communities"; and, given that there was no evidence of widespread voter impersonation in Wisconsin, found that the law was "a cure worse than the disease." In addition to imposing strict voter ID requirements, the law cut back on early voting, required people to live in a ward for at least 28 days before voting, and prohibited emailing absentee ballots to voters. A study by Priorities USA, a progressive advocacy group, estimates that strict ID laws in Wisconsin led to a significant decrease in voter turnout in 2016, with a disproportionate effect on African-American and Democratic-leaning voters.

=== 2017–2019 ===
==== Election Integrity Commission and Crosscheck ====
In May 2017, President Donald Trump established the Presidential Advisory Commission on Election Integrity, purportedly for the purpose of preventing voter fraud. Critics have suggested its true purpose is voter suppression. The commission was led by Kansas attorney general and Republican gubernatorial nominee Kris Kobach, a staunch advocate of strict voter ID laws and a proponent of the Crosscheck system. Crosscheck is a national database designed to check for voters who are registered in more than one state by comparing names and dates of birth. Researchers at Stanford University, the University of Pennsylvania, Harvard University, and Microsoft found that for every legitimate instance of double registration it finds, Crosscheck's algorithm returns approximately 200 false positives. Kobach has been repeatedly sued by the American Civil Liberties Union (ACLU) and other civil rights organizations for trying to restrict voting rights in Kansas. On February 20, 2016, while speaking to a committee of Kansas 2nd Congressional District delegates, regarding their challenges of the proof-of-citizenship voting law he championed in 2011, Kobach said, "The ACLU and their fellow communist friends, the League of Women Voters—you can quote me on that, the communist League of Women Voters — the ACLU and the communist League of Women Voters sued".

Often, voter fraud is cited as a justification for such measures, even when the incidence of voter fraud is low. In Iowa, lawmakers passed a strict voter ID law with the potential to disenfranchise 260,000 voters. Out of 1.6 million votes cast in Iowa in 2016, there were only 10 allegations of voter fraud; none were cases of impersonation that a voter ID law could have prevented. Only one person, a Republican voter, was convicted. Iowa Secretary of State Paul Pate, the architect of the bill, admitted, "We've not experienced widespread voter fraud in Iowa."

==== Alabama ====
Alabama HB 56, an anti-illegal-immigration bill co-authored by Kansas Secretary of State Kris Kobach and passed in 2011, required proof of citizenship to be presented by voters on Election Day. Much of the law was invalidated on appeal at various levels of appeals courts or voluntarily withdrawn or reworded.

In its 2013 Shelby County v. Holder decision, the Supreme Court of the United States allowed jurisdictions with a history of suppression of minority voters to avoid continuing to abide by federal preclearance requirements for changes in voter registration and casting of ballots. Within 24 hours of that ruling, Alabama implemented a previously passed 2011 law requiring specific types of photo identification to be presented by voters. The state closed DMV offices in eight of ten counties which had the highest percentage black population, but only three in the ten counties with the lowest black population. In 2016, Alabama's Secretary of State (SOS) John Merrill began the process to require proof of citizenship from voters, despite Merrill saying he did not know of any cases where non-citizens had voted. Four-term Republican Representative Mo Brooks found that he himself had been purged from the rolls. Merrill also declined to publicize the passage of legislation that enabled some 60,000 Alabamian former felons to vote. Alabama's requirement regarding proof of citizenship had been approved by federal Election Assistance Commission Director Brian Newby. Kobach had supported Newby in the federal suit, and had appointed him to an elections position in Kansas prior to his EAC appointment.

Alabama boasts the 3rd highest rate of people barred from voting due to a felony conviction per 100,000 residents in each state across the US, according to a recent study. This disproportionately affects African Americans. In 2018, critics accused the state of intentionally disenfranchising non-white voters. The suburban and rural outreach efforts by the Doug Jones campaign were successful and he captured the U.S. Senate seat, the first Democrat in 25 years to do so, and in a state that Donald Trump had won by 30 points.

==== Georgia ====
In Louisville, Georgia, in October 2018, Black senior citizens were told to get off a bus that was to have taken them to a polling place for early voting. The bus trip was supposed to have been part of the "South Rising" bus tour sponsored by the advocacy group Black Voters Matter. A clerk of the local Jefferson County Commission allegedly called the intended voters' senior center to claim that the bus tour constituted "political activity," which is barred at events sponsored by the county. LaTosha Brown, one of the founders of Black Voters Matter, described the trip's prevention as a clear-cut case of "...voter intimidation. This is voter suppression, Southern style." The NAACP Legal Defense and Educational Fund sent a letter to the county calling for an "immediate investigation" into the incident, which it condemned as, "an unacceptable act of voter intimidation," that "potentially violates several laws."

Georgia's Secretary of State, Brian Kemp, the Republican gubernatorial nominee, was the official in charge of determining whether or not voters were allowed to vote in the November 2018 election and has been accused of voter suppression. Minority voters are statistically more likely to have names that contain hyphens, suffixes or other punctuation that can make it more difficult to match their name in databases, experts noted, and are more likely to have their voter applications suspended by Kemp's office. Barry C. Burden, a professor at the University of Wisconsin-Madison and director of its Elections Research Center said, "An unrealistic rule of this sort will falsely flag many legitimate registration forms. Moreover, the evidence indicates that minority residents are more likely to be flagged than are whites." Kemp has suspended the applications of 53,000 voters, a majority of whom are minorities. Strict voter registration deadlines in Georgia prevented 87,000 Georgians from voting because they had registered after the deadline. "Even if everyone who is on a pending list is eventually allowed to vote, it places more hurdles in the way of those voters on the list, who are disproportionately black and Hispanic," said Charles Stewart III, Professor of Political Science at Massachusetts Institute of Technology.

Georgia made efforts to correct voting problems that had occurred in the 2018 election. In the 2020 statewide primary, however, many irregularities were reported, including missing machines at polling places and mail-in ballots that never arrived at voters' houses. Georgia has a law prohibiting felons on probation for crimes involving moral turpitude from voting or registering to vote, with a similar law in Alabama having been criticized by the United States Supreme Court in 471 U.S. 222 (1985) as having roots in white supremacy.

==== Indiana ====
In 2017, Indiana passed a law allowing the state to purge voters from the rolls without notifying them, based on information from the controversial Crosscheck system. The Indiana NAACP and League of Women Voters have filed a federal lawsuit against Connie Lawson, Indiana's Secretary of State, to stop the purges. In June 2018, a federal judge ruled that the law violated the National Voter Registration Act.

==== Wisconsin ====
In 2019, district court Judge Paul V. Malloy of Ozaukee County, Wisconsin removed 234,000 voters from state rolls. Wisconsin's Attorney General Josh Kaul appealed to halt the purge, on behalf of the Wisconsin Elections Commission. The purge was claimed to be targeting voters in the cities of Madison and Milwaukee, and college towns, which all tend to favor Democrats. Disenfranchisement expert Greg Palast ties the Wisconsin effort at voter purging as part of a national Republican strategy.

The issue was brought before the court by the Wisconsin Institute for Law and Liberty (WILL), a conservative organization mostly supported by the Bradley Foundation. The lawsuit demanded that the Wisconsin Election Commission respond to a "Movers Report," generated from voter data analysis produced by the Electronic Registration Information Center (ERIC), a national, non-partisan partnership funded in 2012 by the Pew Charitable Trusts. ERIC shares voter registration information to improve the accuracy of voter rolls. The report tagged 234,039 voters who may have moved to an address that had not yet been updated on their voter registration forms. Despite election officials' protests, Wisconsin may be forced to comply with Malloy's order. On January 2, 2020, WILL said it asked the circuit court to hold the Elections Commission in contempt, fining it up to $12,000 daily, until it advances Malloy's December 17, 2019 order to purge from the voting rolls hundreds of thousands of registered voters who possibly have moved to a different address. The case was being litigated in a state appeals court, but it was thought that the conservative-dominated Wisconsin Supreme Court would be likely to hear it.

== 2020s ==
=== Texas ===
In March 2020, it was reported that Texas leads the South in closing down voting places, making it more difficult for Democratic-leaning African-Americans and Latinos to vote. The 50 counties that have experienced the greatest increases in African-American and Latino populations had 542 polling sites closed between 2012 and 2018, while those with the lowest increases in minority populations had only 34 closures. Brazoria County, south of Houston, closed 60% of its polling places, below the statutory minimum; the county clerk promised this would not happen again. Texas law allows the centralization of vote centers, which sometimes make it easier for people to vote. However, the 334 poll closures outside of vote centers still put Texas ahead of Arizona, Georgia, Louisiana, and Mississippi.

Texas limits who can request absentee postal ballots only to voters over 65, those sick or disabled, those who will be out of the county on election day and those who are in jail. Attempts in court to expand mail in voting before the 2020 elections because of health concerns during the COVID-19 pandemic have been unsuccessful. In addition, some eligible postal voters want to lodge postal ballots in advance in drop-off points rather than rely on the postal service, which had warned that ballot papers may not arrive in time to be counted on election day. However, on October 1, Texas Governor Greg Abbott, a Republican, ordered a limit of one drop-off location per county. Harris County, for example, received national media attention because it is larger than the size of Rhode Island and has 2.4 million registered voters but is being served by only one voting drop-box location. On October 10, a judge blocked the order to allow only one absentee vote drop-off point per county, on the basis that it would affect older and disabled voters. A Texas appeals court on October 23 confirmed the ruling that the Republican governor cannot limit drop-off sites for mail ballots to one per county.

Some prominent Texas Republicans sued Governor Abbott in September 2020, seeking to limit the number of days early voting was allowed in the state. They sought to push back the early voting start date from October 13 to October 19. Early voting had been expanded by the governor in July, in response to the pandemic and to the limits he had imposed on mail in voting. The same lawsuit also sought to limit the time frame for submitting mail-in ballots in person. A similar lawsuit was filed by Houston Republicans a week later, seeking the same restrictions on in person and absentee ballots in Harris County. The Texas Supreme Court ruled against the Republicans and allowed early voting to take place from October 13 to October 30, 2020.

A conservative activist and three Republican candidates sued in late October 2020 to have 127,000 drive-through ballots cast in predominantly Democratic Harris County, tossed. A federal judge rejected the Republican lawsuit, as did the Texas Supreme Court.

Turnout in the 2020 Texas election increased by more than 6%, breaking a 28-year record, with both major-party presidential candidates breaking records for the most votes ever cast for a candidate in Texas.

Attorney General of Texas Ken Paxton has stated that he believed Joe Biden would have won the state if he had not filed a legal action to prevent Harris County from sending out unsolicited mail-in ballots to all its registered voters.

=== COVID-19 pandemic and voting by mail, 2020 US election ===
The COVID-19 pandemic in the United States posed challenges for the 2020 election, with many states expanding mail-in voting to avoid voters having to choose between not voting and risking illness by voting in person. From 2016 to 2020, the share of votes cast by mail increased from 23% to 42%, according to the Center for Election Innovation & Research.

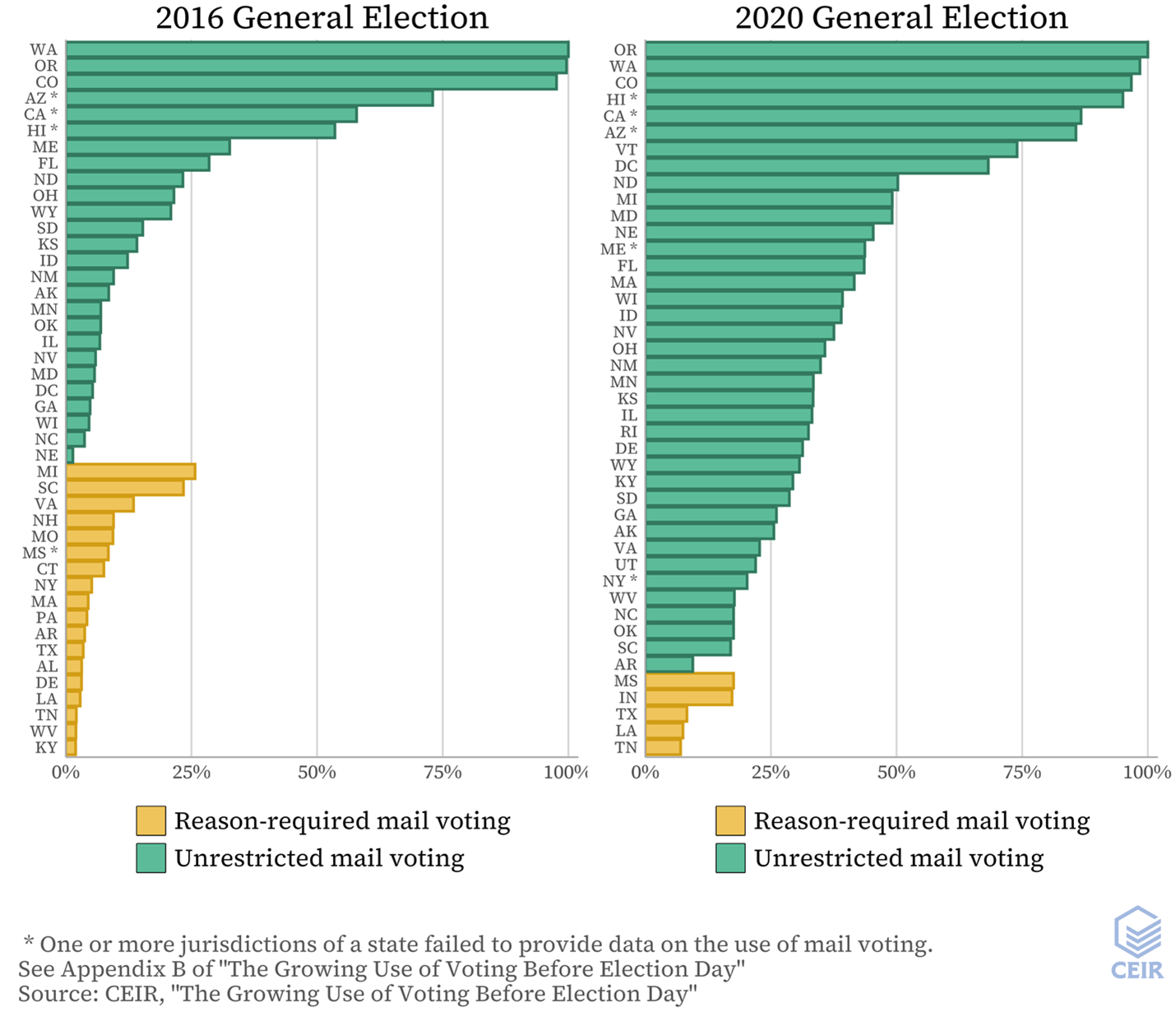
Proportion of votes cast by mail voting

However, President Trump encouraged restricting mail-in voting, and hundreds of lawsuits were filed disputing whether witness requirements, arrival deadlines, the removal of ballot drop-boxes, the reduction of polling places, and aggressive rejection of "mismatched" signatures infringed the right to vote. Controversy also arose around the actions of Postmaster General Louis DeJoy, a major Republican donor to President Donald Trump, who threw out mail-sorting equipment ahead of the 2020 election.

Due to the timing of the coronavirus pandemic with respect to the 2020 presidential election, the Brennan Center for Justice recommended that states establish contingency plans and pandemic task forces to limit the impact the virus has on voter turnout. The memorandum encourages the expansion of early voting and online registration, and a universal vote-by mail option; especially for at-risk groups. The memorandum recommends polling places remain open to the extent permissible by public health mandates, to prevent the disenfranchisement of those for whom voting by mail is difficult. Fifteen states (Alaska, Connecticut, Delaware, Georgia, Hawaii, Indiana, Kentucky, Louisiana, Maryland, New Jersey, Ohio, Pennsylvania, Rhode Island, West Virginia, Wyoming) and Puerto Rico have either delayed their primary elections or switched to voting by mail with extended deadlines. The New York State Board of Elections decided to cancel the 2020 Democratic Primary as New York was experiencing a major outbreak COVID-19 at the time. This decision was met with backlash from supporters of Bernie Sanders' presidential campaign, since although Sanders had suspended his campaign on April 8, he was still eligible to receive delegates and thus influence the 2020 Democratic platform. In Wisconsin, Governor Tony Evers (D) issued an executive order postponing in-person voting and extending the deadline for absentee voting to June, in an attempt to limit the spread of the virus. However, the Wisconsin state Supreme Court denied this order; a decision upheld by the US Supreme Court one day before the primary election.

=== Aftermath of the 2020 election ===
After Joe Biden defeated Donald Trump in the 2020 presidential election, Republican lawmakers around the nation began attacking the voting methods used in the election. Drawing on the false claims of widespread voting fraud and a stolen election, by February 2021 Republican state legislatures had begun to implement new laws and rules to restrict voting access in ways that would favor Republican candidates. By April 2021, 361 bills in 47 states have been proposed by GOP lawmakers meant to restrict voting access.

In March 2021, John Kavanagh, a Republican elected to the Arizona House of Representatives, justified restrictions on voting, saying that "everybody shouldn't be voting ... Quantity is important, but we have to look at the quality of votes, as well."

=== Ohio ===
In late September 2023 ahead of a November election, 26,000 voter registrations were quietly cancelled, drawing renewed criticism of the Republican Secretary of State for possible voter suppression by not following the norm of alerting voter groups and by performing the cancellation so close to an election.

=== SAVE America Act ===
The Safeguard American Voter Eligibility Act (SAVE America Act) is legislation requiring proof of citizenship when voting. Concerns have been raised by Democrats that this legislation would disenfranchise eligible voters. If successfully implemented, the legislation would require citizenship documents to match photographic ID, which requires additional documentation from people who have changed their name after birth, including some married women.

== Anti-suppression efforts ==
Starting in 2015, various states enacted laws for automatic voter registration. At Politico's "State Solutions" voter engagement conference, former Secretary of State and Oregon Governor Kate Brown said, "Registration is a barrier to people participating in this process... [v]oting is a fundamental right of being a citizen, and people across the country should have the ability to access this fundamental right without barriers like registration." She emphatically aimed at critics of policies such as Oregon's "motor voter" law that are aimed at increasing voter turnout, saying, "I think the good news is, in Oregon, we actually want people to vote in our state."

The John Lewis Voting Rights Act, passed by the House of Representatives but not the Senate in 2021, would restore certain provisions of the Voting Rights Act in compliance with and in response to the Shelby County v. Holder decision.

== See also ==
- Cost of voting index (US)
- Democratic backsliding in the United States
- Electoral fraud in the United States
- Gerrymandering in the United States
- Independent state legislature theory § 2020 presidential election and 2022 midterm elections
- Voter Suppression
- Voting Rights Act of 1965 for relevant court cases
- Operation Eagle Eye
