= Jesse Richman (academic) =

American academic

- Education: University of Pittsburgh (BPhil); Carnegie Mellon University (MA, PhD)
- Employer: Old Dominion University

Jesse Richman is an associate professor of political science and geography at Old Dominion University. His research has focused on legislative politics, public opinion, electoral politics, and intellectual property. He is known for his 2014 study with David Earnest about illegal non-citizen voting, which was widely rejected by the broader academic community and was notably misused by Donald Trump and the election denial movement in the United States to justify false claims of widespread fraud. Richman's expert testimony on noncitizen voting in Fish v. Kobach was widely criticized while his expert testimony in Arizona received mixed reviews.

== Education ==
Richman received a Bachelor of Philosophy from the University of Pittsburgh in 1999, a Master of Arts from Carnegie Mellon University in 2001, and a Doctor of Philosophy from Carnegie Mellon in 2005.

He received a Fulbright grant at the National University of Public Service in Budapest, Hungary in 2019.

== 2014 study with David Earnest ==
Before the 2014 study (and after) there was a virtual consensus in academia that noncitizen voting did not exist on any functional level.

In 2014, Richman published a widely discredited study in the Electoral Studies journal with his colleague David Earnest and Gulshan A. Chatta, which extrapolated from Cooperative Congressional Election Study (CCES) survey response data to estimate how many non-citizens voted in 2008 and 2010. The study claimed that 6.4% of noncitizens had voted in 2008 and 2.2% in 2010. Richman stood by his report, though in 2017 he admitted his high-end estimates were unrealistic.

=== Criticism ===
A 2015 study of the same data by CCES coordinators Stephen Ansolabehere, Brian Schaffner and Samantha Luks, published in the same journal, found no evidence of noncitizen voting. Researchers found that at most, one survey respondent was a non-citizen voter, though even that could be due to a false match to a voter record. Brian Schaffner wrote about Richman's study, "I can say unequivocally that this research is not only wrong, it is irresponsible social science and should never have been published in the first place. There is no evidence that non-citizens have voted in recent U.S. elections."

200 political scientists signed an open letter saying Richman's study should "not be cited or used in any debate over fraudulent voting." Richard Hasen in 2020 said, "one wonders how Richman's paper got published." Snopes described the paper as "wildly discredited." Wendy Weiser and Douglas Keith described the study as "thoroughly debunked." Spenser Mestel commented on how unusual it was for Richman to make such broad claims and express so much certainty about his results at the time, which is not typical in studies on voting behavior that are heavily qualified and narrow. In 2017, The New York Times said that the debate has moved on from Richman's study (whose claims it described as having fallen apart) to whether or not any evidence for noncitizen voting exists.

==== Methodological critiques ====
ABC News said the study's methodology was widely criticized. The CCES sent out a newsletter encouraging researchers not to use their data the way that Richman and Earnest did. The main issue with the study is the sample size and the unreliable database of Internet respondents. When the survey was rerun by different researchers and the people who answered the citizenship question differently were removed as presumably having misclicked the survey result in the earlier survey, the researchers found 0 non-citizens who voted. The Intercept argued that five clicks is way too small of a sample size, especially for an online survey, to extrapolate from.

=== Use by others ===
The study was cited, often improperly, by conservative news and conspiracy theory websites, by writers at Breitbart and by Donald Trump, claiming that the study showed non-citizen voting to be a real issue and one that could be changing election outcomes all over the United States. In 2017, Richman rebuked Trump's false claims that millions of non-citizens had voted saying "Trump and others have been misreading our research and exaggerating our results to make claims we don't think our research supports." A self-described political moderate, Richman sometimes regrets publishing the study given how it has been a cornerstone of Trump's false claims of voter fraud and hopes that decisions on what to do about voter fraud are made on the totality of research and not just one cherry-picked study, even if it's the one he published.

== Court testimony ==
=== Fish v. Kobach (2018) ===
In 2017, NBC News described Richman's claim of 18,000 non-citizen voters in Kansas as having been debunked. Richman had extrapolated from "having discovered six noncitizens on a list of Kansans with temporary drivers' licenses who 'either registered to vote or attempted to register to vote." Tomas Lopez of the Brennan Center criticized Richman as putting out big estimates but not checking to see if they are accurate.

Kris Kobach paid Jesse Richman $40,663.35 as an expert witness in 2018 for Fish v. Kobach. ProPublica summarized Judge Julie Robinson's assessment of Richman's conclusions as "'confusing, inconsistent and methodologically flawed,' and adding that they were 'credibly dismantled' by Ansolabehere. She labeled elements of Richman’s testimony 'disingenuous' and 'misleading,' and stated that she gave his research 'no weight' in her decision." Richard Hasen called parts of Richman's testimony "social science at its worst".

=== Arizona citizenship law case (2023) ===
In 2023, Richman examined Arizona state voter and DMV files as an expert witness for a court case on Arizona's proof of citizenship law. Richman said that he found 1,934 registered voters out of more than 4 million whose records indicated they were non-citizens at the time of registration or afterward. He also examined nationwide data from the 2022 Cooperative Election Study (CES), and found that just under one percent of non-citizens were registered to vote. Richman estimated that half a percent of non-citizens had voted in 2022.

U.S. District Judge Susan R. Bolton wrote in her ruling on the case that "the Court found Dr. Richman’s testimony credible and affords his opinions considerable weight." Justin Levitt, who had been skeptical of Richman's earlier research on the topic, said "while the CES data here does look to me to be more reliable than Prof. Richman's prior forays, I'd need some more information before I believed it were reliable" and posited that non-citizen turnout could be lower than Richman estimated. Brian Schaffner "rejects the use of the CES to study noncitizens entirely," one of the techniques used by Richman to claim significant noncitizen voting in Arizona.

== Writing ==
Richman has written opinion pieces for The Monkey Cage blog at the Washington Post.

=== Books ===
Richman has co-authored two books on international trade:

- Trading Away Our Future: How to Fix Our Government-Driven Trade Deficits and Faulty Tax System Before it's Too Late in 2008
- Balanced Trade: Ending the Unbearable Costs of America's Trade Deficits in 2014.

== Service ==
Richman is the faculty advisor for Turning Points USA at Old Dominion University.
