= Illegal voting by noncitizens in the United States =

Illegal voting by noncitizens in the United States occurs when noncitizens vote in elections they are not eligible to, such as federal elections.

== Background ==
Noncitizens who vote illegally may face deportation, up to five years of incarceration or fines, as well as the jeopardizing of naturalization efforts.

While federal law does not prohibit noncitizens from voting in state or local elections, no state has allowed noncitizens to vote in statewide elections since Arkansas became the last state to outlaw noncitizen voting in state elections in 1926.

The federal form to register a voter requires a unique identification number such as a Social Security or driver's license number. New voters must check a box attesting that they are a citizen, though are not required to provide documentary proof of citizenship when registering. States typically have safeguards to prevent noncitizen voting, with voter registration and casting a ballot creating a paper trail. The extent to which states verify citizenship of voters differs.

When noncitizens are added to voter rolls, it is usually by mistake, as the result of a federal law that requires states to offer people voter registration when they visit a motor vehicle office. Unknowingly, noncitizens registered were mostly registered as Democrats in blue states, were on the voter rolls for years, and some even voted in prior elections according to documents obtained via public records request. Sometimes it also appears that more noncitizens are on voter rolls than there are because they became naturalized citizens but have not yet been back to the DMV to update their citizenship status in the DMV database.

== Data ==
in 2008, a heavily-criticized research paper extrapolated from a relatively small survey by Jesse Richman and David Earnest estimated that 6.4% of noncitizens had voted. The study was heavily criticized; 200 political scientists signed an open letter saying the study should not be cited or used in any debate on voter fraud given the unreliability of surveys where participants tend not to pay very close attention to each question they answer. The study was misused by Donald Trump and others to justify false claims it was widespread.

Before the 2014 midterm elections in Florida, 85 names were removed and only one person was prosecuted, after then-governor Rick Scott had announced a plan to purge 180,000 'suspected foreign nationals' from voter rolls.

A study of 2016 data by Brennan Center for Justice from 42 jurisdictions found an estimated 30 incidents of suspected noncitizen voting out of 23.5 million votes cast (or .0001% of votes). In an audit of the 2016 elections, the North Carolina State Board of Elections found that 41 out of 4.8 million total votes were by noncitizens,.

In 2018, CNN reported that in the past three years, Kansas Secretary of State Kris Kobach had convicted three noncitizens of voting out of 1.8 million voters.

Between 1997 and 2022 in Georgia, none of the 'potential noncitizens' that had been flagged had been allowed to register to vote.

Between 2017 and 2024 in North Carolina, only three such cases were referred for prosecution.

In 2024, the Heritage Foundation database included only 24 noncitizen voting cases from between 2003 and 2023. At the time, studies of voter rolls have found very few noncitizen voters.

In 2024, several Republican-led states have flagged and removed purported noncitizens from voter rolls ranging in the hundreds or thousands. These figures have been criticized by voting rights organizations as partisan and erroneously including legal voters, particularly naturalized citizens.

In September 2024, an audit in Oregon found that no more than 5 noncitizens had cast ballots.

In July 2026, an audit in New Jersey found that almost 400 had illegally voted after around 6,600 noncitizens had wrongly been registered to vote in 2023 and 2024 due to a software error. In the same month, Alaska removed 3,500 people from its voter rolls based on flawed and outdated federal and state DMV data.

== Claims ==
=== Statements by journalists ===
According to The Guardian, CNN, AP News, and other major media, illegal voting by noncitizens is extremely rare. (Note: infinitesimal Extremely rare Exceedingly rare Exceptionally rare So rare as to be insignificant Almost never happens Nonexistent problem Rare Microscopic numbers Statistically rare Very rare)

In 2024, Glenn Kessler in The Washington Post stated there was "scattered evidence" of noncitizen voting and little to support the idea that it ever affected the outcome of a major election, but that the scarcity of evidence "does not necessarily prove that the phenomenon does not happen". He wrote that "if a noncitizen casts a ballot, there is no obvious victim to make a complaint and little public documentation to prove that a voter is not a citizen".

=== Statements by politicians ===
Some prominent Republicans such as House Speaker Mike Johnson have argued that widespread noncitizen voting is a threat, though such claims have been largely unsupported by evidence. At a May 8, 2024, press conference in which Johnson demanded that Congress pass an "election integrity" bill to stop noncitizens from voting, reporters pressed him on the lack of evidence. Johnson replied, "We all know intuitively that a lot of illegals are voting in federal elections, but it's not been something that is easily provable."

=== Statements by think tanks ===
In 2020 and 2024, the libertarian Cato Institute said that there was no detectable amount of noncitizen voting, and that noncitizens who can vote in the few local elections where it is legal rarely cast ballots.

A September 2026 study by the Center for Election Innovation & Research found that claims alleging large numbers of possible noncitizens on voter registration rolls are based on "misunderstandings, mischaracterizations, or outright fabrications about complex voter data". All thorough investigations have found that when a handful of noncitizens do vote, it is due to "government system errors, clerical mistakes, or confusion over election rule".

=== Statements by scholars ===
Legal scholar Richard Hasen, who had previously viewed noncitizen voting as a small problem, said in 2020 that claims of noncitizen voting "evaporated in the sunlight of public inspection and legal examination." He also said "spurious claims more likely serve as a pretext for passing laws aimed at making it harder for people likely to vote for Democrats to register and vote."

In 2024, San Francisco State University professor and noncitizen voting expert Ron Hayduk referred to noncitizen voting as a "problem that doesn't exist".

== See also ==
- Electoral fraud in the United States
- Non-citizen suffrage in the United States
