= Peter Levine =

Peter Levine may refer to:

- Peter A. Levine (born 1942), American psychotherapist and creator of Somatic experiencing.
- Peter G. Levine (1960–2022), American stroke researcher and educator.
- Peter J. Levine (born c. 1961), general partner at the Silicon Valley venture capital firm Andreessen Horowitz.
- Peter Levine (born 1967), Tufts University political scientist and organizer of Civic Studies.

== See also ==
- Peter Levin (disambiguation)
