= EAIU =

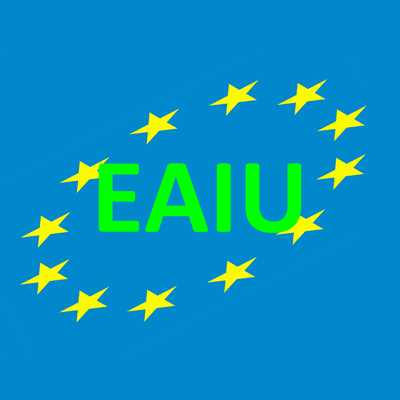
Logo of the EAIU - European Association for Intercultural Understanding

Purpose of the association EAIU - European Association for Intercultural Understanding is to promote education and the support of needy persons on the basis of a broad intercultural understanding.

This cross-cultural understanding also includes the following areas with a

- multicultural education,
- cross-cultural studies
- cross-cultural communication
- anti-racist education,
- human rights education,
- education for active citizenship,
- education and appreciation of people, regardless of age, gender, health status or sexual orientation.

The purpose is achieved in particular through the

- implementation of scientific events,
- conferences,
- seminars,
- teacher trainings,
- publications,
- research projects,
- through participation in international and intercultural projects and
- generally through the promotion of intercultural understanding in the various fields of education.

International: European Association for Intercultural Understanding Deutschland: Europäische Vereinigung für Interkulturelle Verständigung France: Association Européenne pour la Compréhension Interculturelle Espangna: Asociación Europea para el Entendimiento Intercultural

== Materials of the EAIU ==
Between 2008 and 2014 these materials have been developed:

- The Innocent Handbook (in English) made by the Innocent Project
- The Innocent-CD-ROM (in English, German, Spanish, Romanian and Italian)
- The Innocent-WBT (Web Based Training) in English, German, Spanish, Romanian and Italian.
- The Innocent-Teachers-Training-Course held in different countries. The expenses of these courses are paid by the European Commission after doing an application.
- The Self-Evaluation Handbook

== Literature ==
- Roland Schneidt, Mercedes Sole, Antonio Pacifico, Gabriela Iancu (Editor): Innocent Handbook. Verlag Ludwig Schulbuch, Reichertshausen 2008, Germany. ISBN 978-3-89697-111-1
- Roland Schneidt (Editor): Self-Evaluation Handbook. Verlag Ludwig Schulbuch, Reichertshausen 2012, Germany. ISBN 978-3-89697-113-5
