= LaTosha Brown =

American community organizer, political strategist, and consultant

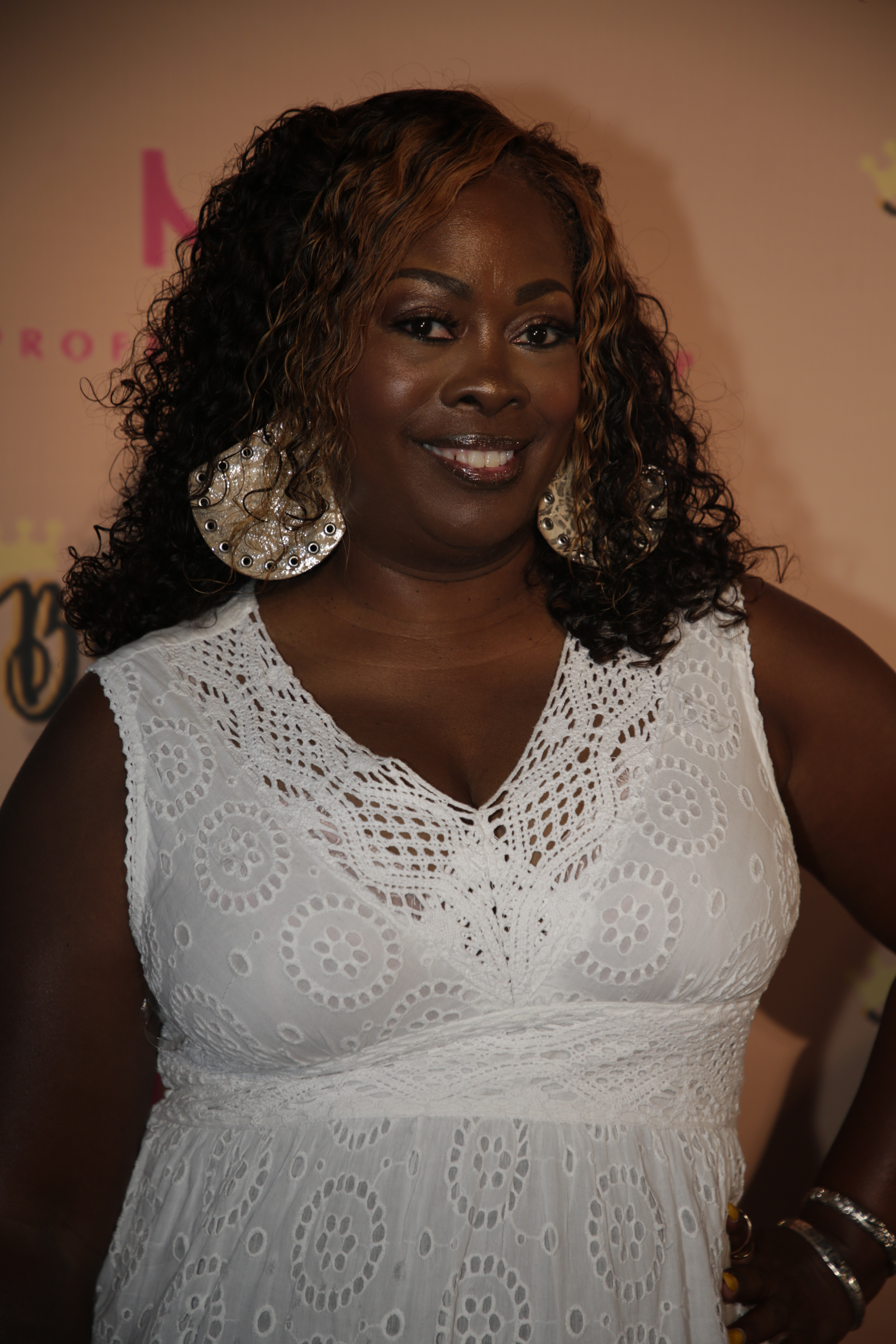
- Brown at the Black Excellence Brunch 2026.
- Born: Selma, Alabama U.S.
- Education: Auburn University at Montgomery
- Occupations: Political consultant Community organizer
- Years active: 1998–present
- Known for: Co-founder, Black Voters Matter

LaTosha Brown is an American community organizer, political strategist, and consultant. She is the co-founder of the voting rights group Black Voters Matter, which has been noted for its work on the 2017 U.S. Senate special election in Alabama and its influence during the 2020–21 Georgia state elections. Brown was born in Selma, Alabama and attended Selma High School and Auburn University at Montgomery. After unsuccessful bids for the Alabama State Board of Education and the Alabama House of Representatives, Brown began working and founding a series of nonprofit organizations centered around disaster relief, Black voting rights, and funding grassroots community development initiatives. In 2016, Brown and fellow activist Cliff Albright founded Black Voters Matter, an organization whose work is credited with significant voter registration and get out the vote efforts in several elections, notably that of United States Senator Doug Jones of Alabama in 2017; the 2020–21 United States Senate election in Georgia; and the 2020–21 United States Senate special election in Georgia.

== Early life and education ==
Brown was born in Selma, Alabama to a farming family. She attended Baptist churches as a child.

Brown's parents separated when Brown was young, and she and her mother moved in with Brown's maternal grandparents in Mobile, Alabama. Brown describes her grandmother as her "soulmate" and a significant influence in her life; from the age of six Brown accompanied her grandmother to the polls where her grandmother "dressed in her Sunday best" and emphasized the importance of her ability to vote: She was born in 1910 and not permitted to do so for most of her life. Brown's grandfather, who had been similarly denied access to the polls throughout his life, carried a poll tax receipt in his wallet as a reminder.

Brown was fascinated with power from a young age: She recalls frequently asking her mother who the owner or leader was each time they entered a restaurant, store or church.

Brown attended Selma High School and had early aspirations of becoming a jazz singer, an interest that she continually incorporates into her work. She attended Auburn University at Montgomery where she studied political science and government. She became a mother during this time and left the university, taking a job at a clothing shop where she began her activism, discussing with customers the books she was reading to pass the time at work.

== Bids for political office ==
=== State Board of Education ===
In 1998, Brown ran for the Democratic nomination for the Alabama State Board of Education's fifth district seat. Her opponent was fellow Democrat Willie J. Paul. After a week-long count of the ballots Paul was declared the winner by fewer than 200 votes.

After the results were certified, the Wilcox County sheriff admitted to storing 800 uncounted ballots in a safe. Since the ballots were discovered after the election was certified, Brown was told they could not be counted. Her only recourse was a lawsuit, which she was not financially able to pursue.

=== Alabama House of Representatives ===
In 2002, Brown ran for the Alabama House of Representatives District 67 seat against fellow Democrat Yusuf Salaam. On June 25, Salaam won the runoff election by 138 votes. Brown officially contested the election. In a June 27 press conference from the Dallas County Courthouse Annex, she and her advisors alleged several irregularities within the voting records, including crossover voting, missing voter lists, illegally opened election boxes, and votes from deceased individuals.

== Nonprofit work ==
=== TruthSpeaks Consulting ===
In 2004, Brown founded TruthSpeaks Consulting, a philanthropy advisory consulting firm in Atlanta, GA.

==== Southern Black Girls and Women’s Consortium ====
In her position with TruthSpeaks Consulting, Brown founded the Southern Black Girls and Women’s Consortium in 2018. "to create a new philanthropic model and framework that will increase investments for Black girls and women in the south." In 2020, the Consortium announced a ten-year, $100 million initiative to support local community organizations in several southern towns and cities who support the empowerment of Black girls and women.

=== Hurricane Katrina/Gulf crisis response ===
Following Hurricane Katrina in 2005, Brown founded and chaired the disaster relief organization Saving OurSelves Coalition, which organized local churches and community organizations to bring food, shelter and medical care to Mississippi and Alabama communities devastated by the storm.

In 2010, Brown also co-founded and served as the first Executive Director of the Rockefeller Philanthropy Advisors’ Gulf Coast Fund for Community Renewal and Ecological Health. During her tenure, the organization gained national prominence, secured partnerships and granted more than $6 million to grassroots organizations throughout the Gulf Coast to help with both hurricane recovery and the aftermath of the Deepwater Horizon oil spill.

=== Grantmakers for Southern Progress ===
In 2014 Brown was made the project director of Grantmakers for Southern Progress, a working group of the Neighborhood Funders Group.

== Black Voters Matter ==
In 2016, Brown and her friend Cliff Albright founded Black Voters Matter (BVM), a 501(c)(4) organization to connect with and support grassroots community infrastructure in Black communities in the Southern United States. Although BVM is credited with significantly combatting voter suppression in key Senate races in 2017, 2020 and 2021, Brown maintains that BVM's work is about Black voters asserting and assuming power by exercising their right to vote.

=== Philosophy ===
Brown's work is focused on challenging Conservatism in the American South, and the effects of voter suppression, particularly concerning Black Americans. She emphasizes the importance of supporting Black women and girls from a young age, citing the intersection of racism and sexism they experience.

Brown is also a jazz singer.

== Awards ==
- 2006 Spirit of Democracy Award
- University of Maryland Baltimore County Louis E. Burnham Award for Human Rights
- 2010 Obama White House Champions of Change award
- Selma-To-Montgomery Foundation's Bridge Crossing Jubilee Award
- 2018 Liberty Bell Award recipient
- 2020 Hauser Leader, Harvard Kennedy School Center for Public Leadership
- Fellowship, Harvard University's Institute of Politics.
