= Fish v. Kobach =

2018 Kansas District Court case

Fish v. Kobach (2:16-cv-02105)
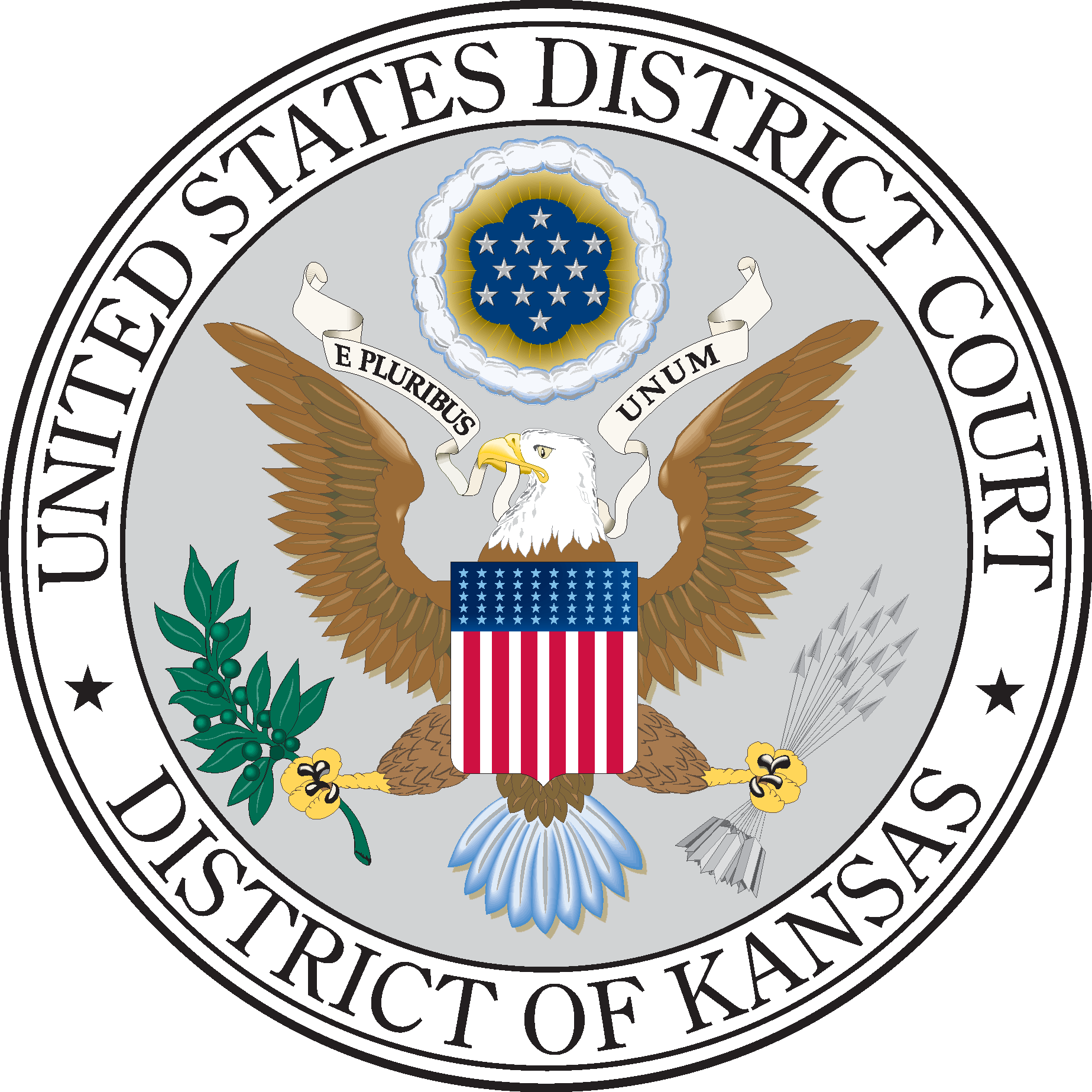
- Court: United States District Court for the District of Kansas
- Full case name: Steven Wayne Fish, Ralph Ortiz, Donna Bucci, Charles Stricker, Thomas J. Boynton and Douglas Hutchinson on behalf of themselves and others similarly situated, v. Kris Kobach, in his official capacity as Secretary of State for the State of Kansas; and Nick Jordan, in his official capacity as Secretary of Revenue for the State of Kansas, Defendants, class action complaint
- Decided: 2018-06-18
- Defendants: Kris Kobach in his official capacity as Secretary of State of Kansas; and Nick Jordan, in his official capacity as Secretary of Revenue for the State of Kansas
- Counsel for plaintiffs: American Civil Liberties Union
- Plaintiffs: Steven Wayne Fish, Ralph Ortiz, Donna Bucci, Charles Stricker, Thomas J. Boynton and Douglas Hutchinson on behalf of themselves and others similarly situated

Court membership
- Judge sitting: Julie A. Robinson

Fish v. Kobach (officially known since January 19, 2019 as Fish v. Schwab) was a 2018 bench trial in the United States District Court for the District of Kansas in which five Kansas residents, the ACLU and the League of Women Voters contested the legality of the Documentary Proof of Citizenship (DPOC) requirement of the Kansas Secure and Fair Elections (SAFE) Act, which was enacted in 2011 and took effect in 2013.

Kris Kobach, then-Kansas Secretary of State, attempted to claim these procedures were needed to protect the nation from a supposedly massive problem of vote fraud by people not legally allowed to do so, including 11.3 percent of non-citizens residing in the US amounting to some 3.2 million votes in 2016. The plaintiffs in this case claimed there was no evidence to support Kobach's allegations and that tens of thousands of American citizens were unnecessarily removed from voter rolls as a result of the law.

Trial hearings ran from March 6 to 19, 2018, with a contempt hearing for Kobach on March 20 with Chief District Judge Julie A. Robinson presiding. Robinson was appointed to the District court by President George W. Bush in 2001. On May 18 Judge Robinson ruled Kobach in contempt. Final rulings were issued June 18 and 19, 2018. In brief, Judge Robinson found that the defense had presented no credible evidence of the massive problem claimed and instead had erected substantial obstacles to voter registration by people eligible to vote per the National Voter Registration Act of 1993 and the Fourteenth Amendment to the United States Constitution. She further found defendant Kobach in contempt of court. The verdict was unanimously upheld upon appeal in 2020.

== Timeline ==
- 2011-04-18: The Kansas Secure and Fair Elections (SAFE) Act was passed by the Kansas legislature in 2011 and signed by the Governor.
  - 2013-01-01: The law takes effect.
- 2016-02-18: The American Civil Liberties Union filed suit against it. The League of Women Voters officially supported that lawsuit.
- 2016-05-17: The United States District Court for the District of Kansas issued a preliminary injunction against enforcement of the Documentary Proof of Citizenship (DPOC) provisions of the SAFE act.
- 2016-05-24: Kobach appealed this ruling to the United States Court of Appeals for the Tenth Circuit.
- 2016-10-18: The appellate court upheld the injunction.
- 2017-06-23: US Magistrate Judge James P. O'Hara fined Kobach $1,000 for "deliberately attempting to mislead the court".
- 2017-07-05: Kobach appealed the contempt ruling.
- 2017-07-25: Chief District Judge Julie Robinson denied Kobach's appeal.
- 2017-08-02: Emergency Motion for Stay filed in 10th Circuit.
- 2017-08-02: 10th Circuit Order Denying Emergency Motion.
- 2018-03-06/19: Bench trial.
- 2018-03-20: Contempt hearing for Mr. Kobach.
- 2018-05-03: Appeal Docket in 10th Circuit.
- 2018-05-18: Contempt ruling.
- 2018-06-18: Findings of Fact and Conclusions of Law by Judge Robinson
- 2018-06-19: Judgment by Timothy O'Brien, Clerk of the District Court
- 2018-07-02: Kobach appealed these findings and conclusions to the United States Court of Appeals for the Tenth Circuit.
- 2019-01-18: The new Kansas Secretary of State, Scott Schwab, substituted for Kris Kobach as the defendant.
- 2020-04-29: The ruling was upheld in 2020 by the 10th Circuit Court of Appeals. The court ruled that of the 39 noncitizens that appear on the Kansas voter rolls, most of them could be due to administrative anomalies. The court also said the law had an undue impact by cancelling or suspending the voter registrations of 31,089 voters.

== Witnesses ==
Judge Robinson further generally found the plaintiff's expert witnesses credible while expert witnesses for the defense were often found to be not credible.

=== Defense ===
==== Jesse Richman ====
Kris Kobach hired Jesse Richman as a paid expert witness in 2018 for Fish v. Kobach. ProPublica summarized Judge Julie Robinson's assessment of Richman's conclusions as "'confusing, inconsistent and methodologically flawed,' and adding that they were 'credibly dismantled' by Ansolabehere. She labeled elements of Richman’s testimony 'disingenuous' and 'misleading,' and stated that she gave his research 'no weight' in her decision."

Richard Hasen called parts of Richman's testimony "social science at its worst."

==== Hans von Spakovsky ====
Hans von Spakovsky, a member of Trump's voter fraud commission, was another expert witness for Kobach whose testimony ProPublica described as having been 'lacerated' by Judge Julie Robinson. She accused him of unsupported and misleading statements as well as false assertions. She said his opinions were based on preconceived beliefs related to his advocacy. "Defendant's expert Hans von Spakovsky is a senior legal fellow at The Heritage Foundation, 'a think tank whose mission [is to] formulate and promote conservative public policies. ... [He] cited a U.S. GAO study for the proposition that the GAO 'found that up to 3 percent of the 30,000 individuals called for jury duty from voter registration roles over a two-year period in just one U.S. district court were not U.S. citizens.' On cross-examination, however, he acknowledged that he omitted the following facts: the GAO study contained information on a total of 8 district courts; 4 of the 8 reported that there was not a single non-citizen who had been called for jury duty; and the 3 remaining district courts reported that less than 1% of those called for jury duty from voter rolls were noncitizens. Therefore, his report misleadingly described the only district court with the highest percentage of people reporting that they were noncitizens, while omitting mention of the 7 other courts described in the GAO report, including 4 that had no incidents of noncitizens on the rolls. ... While [Mr. von Spakovsky's] lack of academic background is not fatal to his credibility ...., his clear agenda and misleading statements ... render his opinions unpersuasive."

Richard Hasen said Spakovsky had a serious credibility problem with a history of not retracting false claims.

=== Plaintiffs ===
"In contrast, Plaintiffs offered Dr. Lorraine Minnite, an objective expert witness, who provided compelling testimony about Defendant's claims of noncitizen registration. Dr. Minnite ... has extensively researched and studied the incidence and effect of voter fraud in American elections. Her published research on the topic spans over a decade and includes her full-length, peer-reviewed book, The Myth of Voter Fraud, for which Dr. Minnite has received grants and professional distinctions, and numerous articles and chapters in edited volumes. ... Notably, Dr. Minnite testified that when she began researching the issue of voter fraud, ..., she began with a 'blank slate' about the conclusions she would ultimately draw from the research. ... Although she admits that noncitizen registration and voting does at times occur, Dr. Minnite testified that there is no empirical evidence to support Defendant's claims in this case that noncitizen registration and voting in Kansas are largescale problems. ... [M]any of these cases reflect isolated incidents of avoidable administrative errors ... and / or misunderstanding on the part of applicants. ... For example, 100 individuals in ELVIS [the Kansas Election Voter Information System] have birth dates in the 1800s, indicating that they are older than 118. And 400 individuals have birth dates after their date of registration, indicating they registered to vote before they were born."

== Rebukes of Kobach by the Judge ==
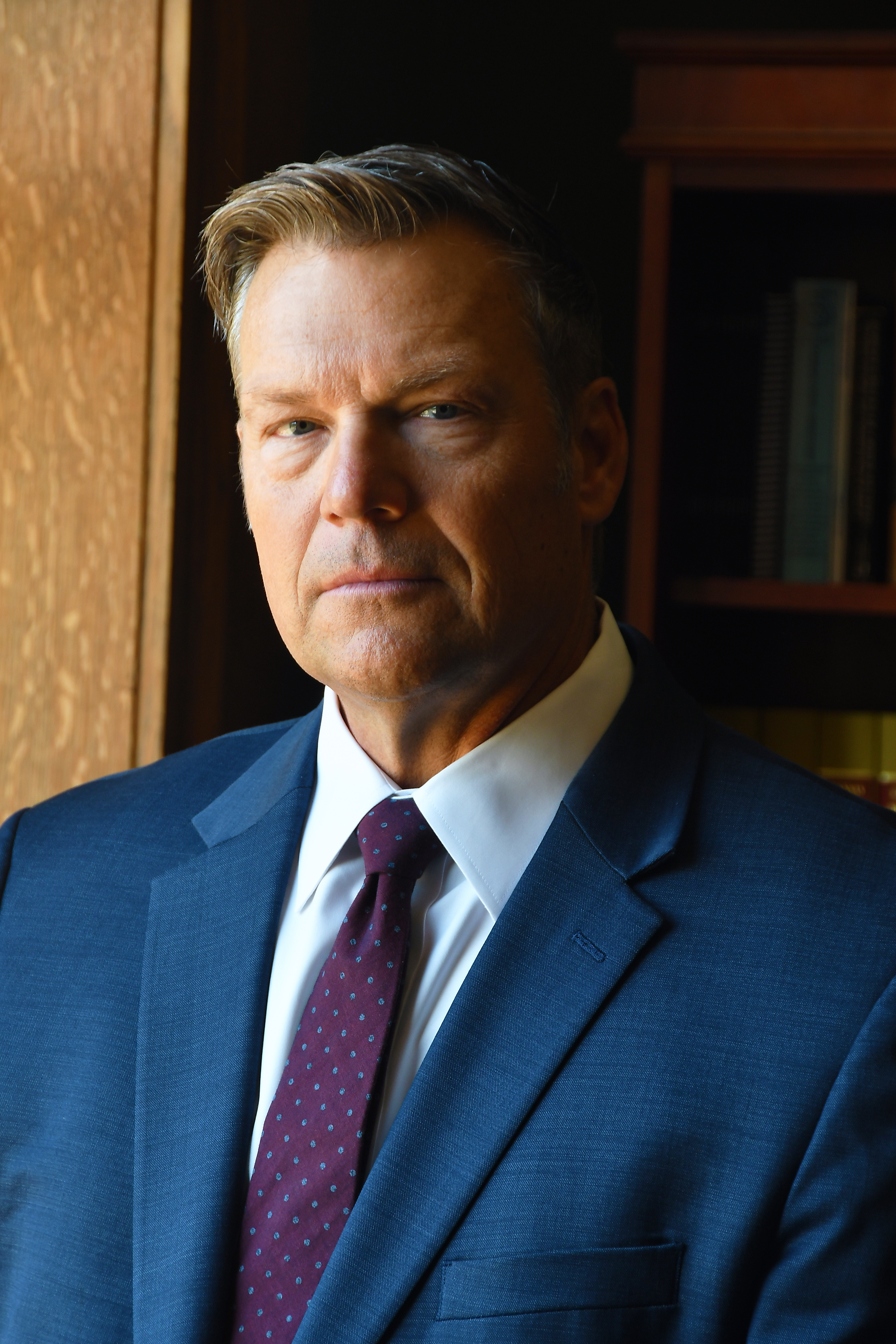
Kobach in 2024

=== Trial by ambush ===
During the first three days of the trial, Robinson repeatedly warned Kobach about trying to introduce evidence that had not been shared with the plaintiffs during discovery. Kobach complained that the discussions "are relying on numbers that are stale". After three days, Robinson said, "We're not going to have a trial by ambush here... You're stuck with what you provided to [the plaintiffs] by the deadline".

=== Contempt hearing ===
Secretary Kobach had been fined $1,000 in 2017 for violating previous court orders in this case. In the March 20, 2018, contempt hearing Judge Julie Robinson was visibly agitated when it was revealed that he had still not complied with her 2016 court orders in two specific ways:

- In 2016 Judge Robinson ordered Kobach to update the state's election manual to make it clear that newly registered voters are exempt from the state's proof-of-citizenship requirements, at least until there is a different judicial ruling in this case. The manual was taken offline but had not yet been updated. Judge Robinson asked, "Isn't one of the advantages of having the manual online is that they can be modified quickly?" She later added it was a "ridiculous system" to take so long to change a few sentences in the manual.
- Kobach was also ordered in 2016 to instruct county election officials that the 35,000 Kansans impacted by the new law should receive the same voter instructions as other voters. This order was upheld against Kobach's appeal to the 10th Circuit Appellate Court in Denver.

In the March 2018 hearings, Kobach claimed he had given verbal instructions to that effect but acknowledged that some county election offices may not have complied with this ruling. Robinson said that Kobach had assured her in telephone hearings that he had instructed his office to order county election officials to mail the postcards to all voters covered by her order. Kobach claimed she had not put that requirement in writing. She replied, "Why would I order something in writing that you've told me is being taken care of? ... (As an officer of the court) you are under an ethical obligation to tell me the truth.'"

On April 18, 2018, Judge Robinson ruled Kobach in contempt. She did not fine him but did order him to pay court costs, including attorney fees for the American Civil Liberties Union, which sought the contempt ruling. Moriah Day, a spokeswoman for Kobach's campaign for governor, said the secretary of state's office would appeal the decision and would have no other comment. (Governor Jeff Colyer, who lost to Kobach in the 2018 Republican primary for Governor, said Kobach should be required to personally pay those fees that had been awarded. Secretary Kobach's office said that Kobach is shielded from any such liability.)

== Findings of fact and conclusions of law ==
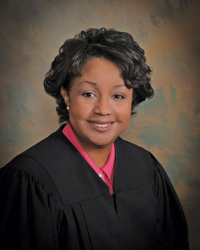
Hon. Julie A. Robinson

On June 18 and 19, 2018, Judge Robinson published 118 pages of "Findings of fact and conclusions of law" in this case. In broad strokes, she sided with the plaintiffs on most of the major points in question and with the defense on a few relatively minor points.

=== Substantive rulings ===
Most importantly, "the Court finds in favor of the Plaintiffs in the Fish case," establishing that the National Voter Registration Act of 1993 (the "motor voter" act) takes precedence over the Kansas DPOC requirements. In addition, the "Court further finds in favor of Plaintiff Bednasek in his constitutional challenge", concluding that the DPOC violated the fourteenth amendment. (Bednasek v. Kobach started as a separate case that was later joined to Fish v. Kobach, because of the similarities of the issues involved.)

"Further, the Court imposes specific compliance measures given the Defendant's history of non-compliance with this Court's orders. And the Court imposes sanctions responsive to Defendant's repeated and flagrant violations of discovery and disclosure rules." In particular, "Defendant shall strictly comply with the directives in this Order meant to enforce the Court's permanent injunction of the DPOC law and K.A.R. sec. 7-23-15. It is further ordered that Defendant shall attend 6 hours [of continuing legal education (CLE) on civil rules of procedure or evidence] in addition to any other CLE education required by his law license for the 2018-2019 reporting year."

=== Lesser findings and rulings ===
In addition to findings regarding the witness testimony above:

Defendant Nick Jordan, Kansas Secretary of Revenue, was dismissed from the case.

Mr. Fish's complaint was declared moot, because "in September or October 2016, he relocated within Douglas County and changed his address with the DOV in person. ... He is now registered to vote ... not due to the Court's preliminary injunction, but his voluntary action of reapplying to register to vote at which time he provided DPOC."

=== Magnitude of the problems ===
"The voting rate among purported noncitizen registrations on [a Kansas temporary driver license] match list is around 1%, whereas the voting rate among registrants in Kansas more generally is around 70%."

Beyond noting that only about 1% of registrants purported to be noncitizens actually voted, the court found that "31,089 total applicants ... were denied registration for failure to provide DPOC, ... [which] represented 12.4% of new voter registrations between January 1, 2013 and December 11, 2015", the cutoff date for confidential ELVIS data provided to plaintiff's expert witness, Dr. Michael McDonald, an associate professor of political science at the University of Florida and a leading scholar on American elections, voter registration, and factors affecting voter behavior and turnout.

By comparison, "Defendant already has prosecutorial authority over Kansas election crimes. Yet, since obtaining this authority, and despite claiming to have located 129 instances of noncitizen registration in Kansas, Defendant has filed zero criminal complaints against noncitizens for registering to vote." But "looking closely at those [129] records reduces that number to 67 at most. Even these 67 instances are a liberal estimate because it includes attempted registrations after the DPOC law was passed, a larger universe than what the Tenth Circuit asked the Court to evaluate. Only 39 successfully registered to vote. ... And several of the individual records of those who registered or attempted to register show errors on the part of State employees, and/or confusion on the part of applicants." Moreover, those 39 represent only "0.002% of all registered voters in Kansas as of January 1, 2013 (1,762,330). Defendant Kobach "insists that [published numbers of noncitizens voting] are just 'the tip of the iceberg.' This trial was his opportunity to produce credible evidence of that iceberg, but he failed to do so. ... Instead, the Court draws the more obvious conclusion that there is no iceberg; only an icicle, largely created by confusion and administrative error."

=== Summary of impact on democracy in Kansas ===
The court found that "31,089 total applicants ... were denied registration for failure to provide DPOC, ... [which] represented 12.4% of new voter registrations between January 1, 2013 and December 11, 2015". Meanwhile, Kansas Secretary of State Kobach, who claimed this was a massive problem, provided evidence of only 39 cases of non-citizens having registered to vote in Kansas, which represented only "0.002% of all registered voters".
