= Brian Schaffner =

American political scientist

- Born: Brian Frederick Schaffner; April 20, 1975 (age 50); New Jersey, United States
- Education: University of Georgia (B.A., 1997), Indiana University Bloomington (Ph.D., 2002)
- Known for: Cooperative Congressional Election Study
- Scientific career
- Fields: Political science
- Institutions: University of Massachusetts Amherst (2010-2018), Tufts University (2018-Present)
- Thesis: House members, legislative activities, and local coverage (2002)

Brian Frederick Schaffner is an American political scientist. He is the Newhouse Professor of Civic studies at Tufts University and a faculty associate at Harvard University's Institute for Quantitative Social Science. He is also the founding director of the UMass Poll and a co-principal investigator for the Cooperative Congressional Election Study (CCES), a survey of about 50,000 U.S. voters. He has criticized President Donald Trump for citing a 2014 study based on data from the CCES as proof that voter fraud is widespread in the United States. Of this study, Schaffner told CNN that "Of the people who we were sure were non-citizens, we could not find any who actually cast a vote." He has also said that the authors of the study Trump cited, Jesse Richman and David Earnest, used inaccurate methodology to conclude that millions of non-citizens voted in U.S. elections. He told MassLive.com in January 2017 that "I have been very vocal in speaking out about the study, especially because I feel a sense of responsibility".

== Selected works ==
- Campaign Finance and Political Polarization: When Purists Prevail, with Raymond J. La Raja. (University of Michigan Press, 2015 ISBN 978-0-472-07299-6).
