= Civic studies =

Interdisciplinary field

Civic studies is an interdisciplinary field that empirically investigates civic engagement, civic education, and civil society. It also aims to influence the social sciences and humanities in general to take the perspective of intentional human actors—people who reason and work together to improve their worlds—in addition to institutions and impersonal social forces.

== Origins ==
A seminal statement is "The New Civic Politics: Civic Theory and Practice for the Future" (2007) by Harry Boyte, Stephen Elkin, Peter Levine, Jane Mansbridge, Elinor Ostrom, Karol Soltan, and Rogers Smith. The authors write:

We see before us an emerging civic politics, along with an emerging intellectual community, a field, and a discipline. Its work is to understand and strengthen civic politics, civic initiatives, civic capacity, civic society and civic culture. It is emerging in many disciplines and fields of human endeavor.

Elinor Ostrom's whole body of work, for which she won the 2009 Nobel Memorial Prize in Economic Sciences, has been interpreted as an important forerunner of Civic Studies. John Dewey, Jürgen Habermas, William James, and Pope Francis are also cited as influences or inspirations. Filippo Sabetti traces Civic Studies back to the practices of "governance [that] were worked out in the free cities of Germany and Italy" in the Middle Ages.

== Uses in scholarly literature ==
Civic Studies is the explicit focus in an emerging scholarly literature. Alison K. Cohen, J. Ruth Dawley-Carr, Liza Pappas, and Alison Staudinger write that the question "What is a good citizen?" is fundamental to Civic Studies. This question leads to more specific ones, such as the relationship between citizens and any particular nation-state or regime, and the skills and behavior of "a good citizen." They write, "Questions like these are not currently central to any particular academic discipline and require innovative interdisciplinary rethinking. The emerging field of civic studies, which is organically developing within several academic and political sectors, offers a particularly promising home.

In the 2017 Dewey Lecture for the John Dewey Society, Harry C. Boyte writes that a "concept of citizen as co-creator" is definitive of "our new field of civic studies."

Meira Levinson writes that an aim of her book No Citizen Left Behind was "to bring together research and practice from ... shockingly distinct literatures, traditions, and knowledge bases. ... In so doing, I am indebted to Peter Levine and Karol Soltan for their work fostering a broader field of “civic studies.”

In her book American Public Education and the Responsibility of its Citizens, Sarah Stitzlein writes: "I join the efforts of the emerging field of Civic Studies as I tackle social problems using philosophy and social science to address a larger audience concerned with civic renewal." She also identifies with "the spirit of Civic Studies" because she seeks to "emphasize the agency of ... citizens as they co-create their worlds via schools. From a European perspective, Nora Schröder writes:

The development of Civic Studies as an academic discipline can be regarded as a political project in two ways: First, it aims at improving societies by helping the citizens to engage politically. Second, it challenges dominant scientific principles by its self-understanding as a normative science engaged in participatory research and active political engagement.

Susan Orr and James Johnson see research on workers' self-management as a fruitful contribution to Civic Studies.

Peter Levine's books We Are the Ones We Have Been Waiting For and What Should We Do? A Theory of Civic Life offer overviews of Civic Studies.

Joshua Forstenzer argues that Civic Studies continues the tradition of John Dewey's experimentalism.

Civic Studies has been applied in STEM fields as well. For example, in sustainability research, it has been cited as the source of the question, "What do academics who work in the humanities and social sciences have to offer to food justice, if anything?" In a white paper commissioned for a National Science Foundation workshop on Civic Science, Gwen Ottinger & Nicholas Jordan write, "Civic studies provides a framework for conceptualizing how scientific inquiry can serve as a democratic practice, and for theorizing about the contributions of scientific practice to democratic culture."

== Practical initiatives ==
The Good Society is "A Journal of Civic Studies"

Civic Studies is an undergraduate major at Tufts University; an inititiative at Augsburg University; and a focus of the University of Minnesota's College of Education and Human Development. Several individual scholars describe their work as contributions to Civic Studies, e.g., Cornell University Development Sociologist Scott Peters and University of Delaware civil discourse and deliberation scholar Timothy J. Shaffer. In April 2016, Tufts University "announced a $15 million gift from alumnus (A'76) Jonathan Tisch and his wife, Lizzie" for Civic Studies. Brian Schaffner is the Newhouse Professor of Civic Studies at Tufts University. McMaster University's Wilson College of Leadership and Civic Engagement, established in 2023, has an Endowed Chair in Leadership and Civic Studies.

The Summer Institute of Civic Studies has been held annually at Tufts University's Tisch College of Civic Life since 2009. The European Summer Institute of Civic Studies has been held in various locations in Ukraine and Germany annually since 2015.

== See also ==
- Active citizenship
- Civil awareness
