= Innocent Project =

Teacher-training project

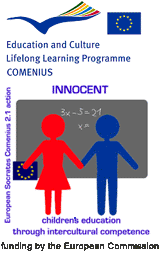
INNOCENT is a transnational project, co-financed by the European Commission DG Education&Culture under the No. 226695-CP-1-2005-1-DE-COMENIUS-C21

The Innocent Project is a teachers' training project in the framework of the program "Life Long Learning" by the European Commission, which presents free material for lessons and training of teachers, to integrate pupils of foreign origin into the education (inter cultural education).

Partners in the project were teachers from Germany, Italy, Spain and Romania. The EAIU is a partner of the Innocent project.

== Materials ==
Between 2005 and 2008 these materials have been developed:

- The Innocent Handbook (in English)
- The Innocent-CD-ROM (in English, German, Spanish, Romanian and Italian)
- The Innocent-WBT (Web Based Training) in English, German, Spanish, Romanian and Italian.
- The Innocent-Teachers-Training-Course held in different countries. The expenses of these courses are paid by the European Commission after doing an application.

== Literature ==
- Roland Schneidt, Mercedes Sole, Antonio Pacifico, Gabriela Iancu (Editor): Innocent Handbook. Verlag Ludwig Schulbuch, Reichertshausen 2008, Germany. ISBN 978-3-89697-111-1
