= Peter Levin (disambiguation) =

Peter Levin (born 1932) is an American director.

Peter Levin may also refer to:

- Peter Levin, co-founder of Nerdist Industries
- Pete Levin (born 1942), American jazz keyboardist, composer, and record producer
- Peter Levin, keyboard musician and past member of The Blind Boys of Alabama

== See also ==
- Peter Leven
- Peter Levine (disambiguation)
- Peter Levinson
