= Hans von Spakovsky =

American lawyer (born 1959)

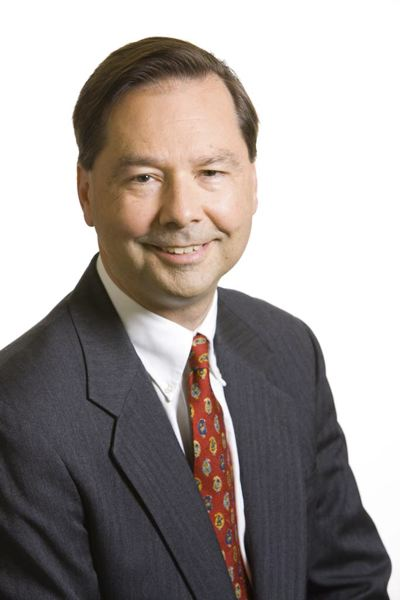
- Von Spakovsky in March 2011
- Born: Hans Anatol von Spakovsky; March 11, 1959 (age 67); Huntsville, Alabama, U.S.
- Education: Massachusetts Institute of Technology (BS); Vanderbilt University (JD)
- Occupation: Attorney
- Employer: The Heritage Foundation
- Political party: Republican

Hans Anatol von Spakovsky (born March 11, 1959) is an American attorney and a former member of the Federal Election Commission (FEC). He is the former manager of The Heritage Foundation's Election Law Reform Initiative and a senior legal fellow in The Heritage Foundation's Meese Center for Legal and Judicial Studies. He is an advocate for stricter voting laws. He has been described as playing an influential role in making concern about voter fraud mainstream in the Republican Party.

He was nominated to the FEC by President George W. Bush on December 15, 2005, and appointed by recess appointment on January 4, 2006. However, von Spakovsky's nomination was opposed by Senate Democrats, who argued that his oversight of voter laws was unacceptably partisan. Opposition to his nomination was bolstered by objections from career Justice Department staff, who accused von Spakovsky of politicizing his nominally non-partisan office to an unprecedented degree. While von Spakovsky and the Bush Administration denied the accusations of partisanship, the nomination was withdrawn on May 15, 2008.

Von Spakovsky subsequently joined the staff of The Heritage Foundation, a politically conservative think tank. On June 29, 2017, President Donald Trump named him as a member of the Presidential Advisory Commission on Election Integrity, which disbanded after six months amid controversy. Spakovsky wrote the Project 2025 section on federal election oversight.

== Early life and education ==
Von Spakovsky was born in Huntsville, Alabama, where his parents had eventually settled after immigrating to the United States in 1951. His German mother met his Russian father Anatol von Spakovsky, a White émigré who had settled in Yugoslavia after World War I and then fled to Germany after World War II, staying in a German displaced persons camp in Bavaria. Von Spakovsky graduated from Virgil I. Grissom High School in 1977, received a B.S. degree from the Massachusetts Institute of Technology in 1981, and a J.D. degree from the Vanderbilt University Law School in 1984. Von Spakovsky is a member of the Georgia and Tennessee bars.

== Career ==
Before entering politics, he worked as a government affairs consultant, in a corporate legal department, and in private practice. Von Spakovsky served as Republican Party chairman in Fulton County, Georgia, and as a Republican appointee to the Fulton County Registration and Election Board, where he championed strict voter-identification laws.

Von Spakovsky became a member of Voting Integrity Project, which investigated alleged voter fraud across the United States, as well as a member of the politically conservative Federalist Society. He worked as a lawyer for George W. Bush's team during the 2000 Florida Presidential election recount. After Bush's election victory, von Spakovsky was appointed to the Civil Rights division of the U.S. Department of Justice.

In 2023, von Spakovsky authored the chapter on the Federal Election Commission for the ninth edition of the Heritage Foundation's book Mandate for Leadership, which provides the policy agenda for Project 2025.

=== Controversies ===
==== Efforts to exclude Democrats and mainstream Republicans from presidential advisory commission ====
On February 22, 2017, von Spakovsky sent an email arguing against the appointment of Democrats and "mainstream Republicans" to the Trump administration's Presidential Advisory Commission on Election Integrity. The email was forwarded to U.S. Attorney General Jeff Sessions by an aide. The release of the email led civil rights leaders to call for von Spakovsky to step down from the commission and for the commission to be disbanded by early 2018.

==== Justice Department tenure ====
Von Spakovsky was hired to the U.S. Department of Justice as an expert on elections. He advocated for what he described as the application of the Voting Rights Act of 1965 in a "race-neutral manner." Von Spakovsky was also tasked with guiding the Bush Administration's role in passing legislation that became known as the Help America Vote Act. Von Spakovsky's tenure at the Justice Department was marked by a focus on voter eligibility and voter fraud. In 2005, he led the department's approval of a controversial Georgia law requiring voters to produce photo ID, despite strong objections from Justice Department staff that the law would disproportionately harm and disenfranchise African-American voters. Von Spakovsky subsequently acknowledged that he had written a law review article supporting such photo ID laws under the pseudonym "Publius", prompting concerns that he should have recused himself from the Justice Department decision.

A portion of the law was subsequently overturned by a federal judge, who compared it to a "Jim Crow-era poll tax". However, the voter ID portion was approved and was in effect in the 2008 election. Subsequently, the Eleventh Circuit Court of Appeals upheld Georgia's voter ID requirement in 2009. Also see:

During von Spakovsky's tenure, more than half of the career Justice Department staff left the voting section in protest. Von Spakovsky argued against the re-authorization of the Voting Rights Act in 2006, but the re-authorization overwhelmingly passed Congress and was signed into law by the Bush Administration.

Von Spakovsky also served on the Board of Advisors of the Election Assistance Commission, a government commission created by the Help America Vote Act of 2002. He clashed with the commission head, Paul DeGregorio. Several individuals with knowledge of the situation, speaking anonymously to McClatchy Newspapers, alleged that DeGregorio had resisted an overtly partisan agenda and his removal was therefore engineered by von Spakovsky.

==== Federal Election Commission ====
Von Spakovsky received his recess appointment by President George W. Bush to the Federal Election Commission in January 2006. His confirmation hearings were contentious, as Democratic Senators criticized von Spakovsky's Justice Department tenure and accused him of partisanship. A group of career Justice Department staff wrote a letter to the Senate arguing against von Spakovsky's appointment, saying that he "played a major role in the implementation of practices which injected partisan political factors into decision-making on enforcement matters and into the hiring process, and included repeated efforts to intimidate career staff." In response to questioning from the Senate, von Spakovsky repeatedly asserted that he could not remember or recall his involvement in various controversial Justice Department decisions, drawing comparisons to the testimony of former Attorney General Alberto Gonzales.

Faced with mounting opposition, von Spakovsky ultimately withdrew from the FEC confirmation process. He subsequently assumed a position with The Heritage Foundation, a politically conservative think tank, and accepted a directorship at the non-profit watchdog legal group Public Interest Legal Foundation.

Von Spakovsky has claimed that about 1400 votes, four times the margin of victory, were cast by ineligible prisoners in the 2008 Minnesota race for U.S. Senate, which was won by Al Franken. However, von Spakovsky's statistics have been labeled "fraudulent" by the Hennepin County Attorney who investigated the matter.

==== Claims about voter fraud ====
According to The New Yorker, von Spakovsky has promoted "the myth that Democratic voter fraud is common, and that it helps Democrats win elections".

Von Spakovsky has supported his claims about the extent of voter fraud by citing a 2000 investigation by The Atlanta Journal-Constitution, which purported to find 5400 instances of deceased people in Georgia voting in the last two decades. The Journal-Constitution later revised its findings, noting that it had no evidence of a single deceased person voting and that the vast majority of the instances were due to clerical errors.

In a 2012 interview with The New Yorker, von Spakovsky cited two scholars who he said could substantiate that voter-impersonation fraud was a significant threat: Robert Pastor of American University and Larry Sabato of the University of Virginia. Von Spakovsky said that Pastor had personally experienced voter impersonation, but Pastor refuted von Spakovsky's claim, saying, "I think they just mistakenly checked my name when my son voted—it was just a mistake. I don't think that voter-impersonation fraud is a serious problem." Both Pastor and Sabato said that they would only support voter ID laws if voter IDs were made free and easily available to all, which is not what Republicans have tried. Sabato, the author of "Dirty Little Secrets," also described voter impersonation as "relatively rare today." In a 2011 article published by The Heritage Foundation, von Spakovsky again referred to Sabato as an authority to establish the existence of common voter fraud, along with "Stealing Elections," a book by John Fund, whose claims of voter fraud have been extensively debunked, and whom he neglects to identify as the co-author of a book they jointly wrote. He describes the efforts of Kansas Secretary of State Kris Kobach, his colleague both at the Presidential Advisory Commission on Election Integrity and Heritage, to expose the alleged existence of extensive voter fraud, as "carefully described research," although Kobach's claims have also been shown to be vastly overstated.

In a court decision, Fish v. Kobach, US District Court Judge Julie A. Robinson ruled that von Spakovsky's claims of widespread voter fraud were not in fact found to be backed up with provable researched cases. Judge Robinson wrote that she gave his testimony little weight because it was "premised on several misleading and unsupported examples of non-citizen voter registration, mostly outside the State of Kansas." She also noted that during the proceedings, Mr. von Spakovsky "could not identify any expert on the subject of non-citizen voter registration." When he tried to use a list of 30 people provided by a Kansas election official as proof of voter fraud in one county, Judge Robinson wrote in her decision: "He later admitted during cross-examination that he had no personal knowledge as to whether or not any of these individuals had in fact falsely asserted U.S. citizenship when they became registered to vote and he did not examine the facts of these individual cases." Judge Robinson found witnesses for the defense were often found to be not credible, finding: "Defendant's expert Hans von Spakovsky is a senior legal fellow at The Heritage Foundation, 'a think tank whose mission [is to] formulate and promote conservative public policies'." Von Spakovsky "...cited a U.S. GAO study for the proposition that the GAO 'found that up to 3 percent of the 30,000 individuals called for jury duty from voter registration roles over a two-year period in just one U.S. district court were not U.S. citizens'." However, on cross-examination, he admitted that the GAO study contained information on a total of eight district courts; half reported that not one non-citizen had been called for jury duty. The three remaining district courts reported that less than 1% of those called for jury duty from voter rolls were noncitizens. Therefore, his report misleadingly described the single district court with the highest percentage of people reporting that they were noncitizens, while omitting mention of the seven other courts described in the GAO report, including four that had zero incidents of noncitizens on voting rolls. Robinson said, "While von Spakovsky's lack of academic background is not fatal to his credibility ...., his clear agenda and misleading statements ... render his opinions unpersuasive."

According to Richard Hasen, an election law expert and professor at University of California, Irvine, "there are a number of people who have been active in promoting false and exaggerated claims of voter fraud and using that as a pretext to argue for stricter voting and registration rules. And von Spakovsky's at the top of the list." Hasen said that von Spakovsky's appointment to Donald Trump's Commission on Election Integrity was "a big middle finger" from Trump to people "serious about fixing problems with our elections."

== Political positions ==
=== Climate change ===
Von Spakovsky rejects the scientific consensus on climate change, calling climate change "a contentious and unproven scientific theory."

=== Immigration ===
Von Spakovsky praised the Supreme Court's decision to partially allow President Trump's executive order banning travel from seven predominantly Muslim countries to go into effect pending Supreme Court review of the case. Von Spakovsky termed the decision a big victory for the administration. According to The Washington Post, von Spakovsky's support for the travel ban "appeared to be a departure from von Spakovsky's earlier beliefs that America has a role in the world to accept refugees, like his parents."

Von Spakovsky has said that sanctuary policies contribute to crime.

Von Spakovsky said in July 2015 that the Obama administration released "134,000 (criminal) aliens... in just the past two years." PolitiFact found that the statement was half-true and had several flaws: "About half of von Spakovsky's total, 66,000, involved convicted criminals who had completed their sentences but remained in custody pending deportation. For some large fraction of that group, perhaps as high as 45 percent, it was a court ruling that drove the release, not a decision by the administration. Regarding the other half of von Spakovsky's total, 68,000, it is likely that in most cases ICE decided not to pursue deportation. However, some portion of that group might not have been deportable, and some portion might have continued to serve out a locally imposed sentence and not been released."
