= Filippo Sabetti =

Political science professor

Filippo Sabetti is a professor of political science at McGill University. He holds a bachelor's degree (summa cum laude) in History and Politics from McMaster University (1968), Woodrow Wilson Fellow (1969), a M.A. and a Ph.D. in political science from Indiana University Bloomington (1970 and 1977, respectively). His research interests cover Canadian and Comparative Politics, Social Dilemmas, History of Self-Governance, Religion and Public Life, Political Economy of Crime and Punishment, and Development of Constitutional and Federalist Political Thought.

== Career ==
Filippo Sabetti is currently Professor of Political Science and Director of Graduate Studies (Political Science Department) at McGill University. He has held other academic and research positions, such as associate professor of Political Science at McGill (1980–1999), Adjunct Scholar at the Center for the Study of Federalism at Temple University (1982–1999), and assistant professor of Political Science at McGill University (1974–1980).

Professor Sabetti has received over 30 awards and honors.

== Publications ==
=== Books ===
- Civilization and Self-Government: The Political Thought of Carlo Cattaneo. Lanham, Maryland: Lexington Books, 2011.
- Alla Ricerca del Buon Governo in Italia. Manduria-Rome: Piero Lacaita Editore, 2004.
- Village Politics and the Mafia in Sicily. San Francisco: ICS Press; and Montreal: McGill-Queen's University Press, 2002.
- The Search for Good Government: Understanding the Paradox of Italian Democracy. Montreal: McGill-Queen's University Press, 2000. Shortlisted for the Canadian Social Science Prize.
- Politica e potere in un comune siciliano. Cosenza: Pellegrini Editore 1993.
- Political Authority in a Sicilian Village. New Brunswick, New Jersey: Rutgers University Press, 1984.

=== Editing ===
- The Practice of Constitutional Development: Vincent Ostrom’s Quest to Understand Human Affairs. Lanham, Maryland: Lexington Books, 2009 (with Barbara Allen and Mark Sproule-Jones)
- The Struggle to Constitute and Sustain Productive Orders: Vincent Ostrom’s Quest to Understand Human Affairs. Lanham, Maryland: Lexington Books, 2008 (with Barbara Allen and Mark Sproule-Jones)
- Libertà e liberali in Europa e in America [Liberty and Liberalism in Europe and America]. Milan: Edizioni Guerini e Associati, 2007 (ed.)
- Civilization and Democracy: The Salvemini Anthology of Cattaneo’s Writings. Toronto: University of Toronto Press, 2006 (with Carlo G. Lacaita)
- Italian Politics & Society (number 60) Spring 2005, 102 pages (with Anthony C. Masi)
- Italian Politics & Society (number 59) Fall 2004, 60 pages (with Anthony C. Masi)
- Il Crimine in America. Cosenza: Pellegrini Editore, 2001 (with Saverio Di Bella and Pierre Tremblay)
- Italian Politics: A Review, volume 5 (with R. Catanzaro). London: Pinter Publishers, 1991
- Politica in Italia: I fatti dell’anno e le interpretazioni Edizione 90. Bologna: Il Mulino, 1990 (with R. Catanzaro)
- Canadian Federalism: From Crisis to Constitution (with Harold M. Waller and Daniel J. Elazar). Lanham, Maryland: University Press of America, 1988
- Crisis and Continuity in Canadian Federalism (special issue of Publius, volume 14, 1984, with H.M. Waller)
