= Active citizenship =

Citizens influencing decisions and engaging with services are

Active citizenship is the engagement of citizens in the governance of their daily lives as users of public services. This engagement enables citizens to exercise influence over decisions, articulate concerns, and participate in the provision of services. This encompasses both the right to make choices and the right to express one's opinions, thereby empowering citizens to influence the delivery of public services by engaging in local policy initiatives, interacting with institutional entities, and articulating their preferences. This concept encompasses a wide range of activities, including those that take place in various spheres of society, such as politics, the workplace, civil society, and private domains. This concept underscores the significance of citizens' interactions with staff, administrators, and politicians at various levels in shaping services that align with their needs. The analysis encompasses three dimensions: choice, empowerment, and participation. The concept of choice encompasses informed decisions regarding the utilization of services, while empowerment enables individuals to exercise control over their lives as users. Participation encompasses engagement in policy processes and the ability to influence services.

== Description ==
Active citizenship or engaged citizenship refers to active participation of a citizen under the law of a nation discussing and educating themselves in politics and society, as well as a philosophy espoused by organizations and educational institutions which advocates that individuals, charitable organizations, and companies have certain roles and responsibilities to society and the environment. Active citizens may be involved in public advocacy and protest, working to effect change in their communities.

An active citizen is someone who takes a role in the community; the term has been identified with volunteering by writers such as Jonathan Tisch, who wrote in the Huffington Post in 2010 advocating that busy Americans should try to help others, particularly by offering high-level professional expertise in such areas as banking, education, engineering, and technology to help the less fortunate.

Active citizenship is considered a buzzword by somedue to its vague definition. Examples include volunteering, donating, and recycling.

Developments in social media and media literacy have changed how scholars begin to look at, and define active citizenship. Active citizenship in politics can lead to an apparent consumption of the engaged person rather than offering people with an informed, active opinion. Social media sites let people spread information, and create events to provide opportunities for engaged citizenship.

Social media and the internet provide a public access point to government affairs, and policy, away from town hall meetings, creating communities with similar concerns to recognize the pitfalls of governments and government policies.

== Examples of active citizenship in education ==
Due to concerns over such things as a lack of interest in elections (reflected by low voter turnout), the British Government has launched a citizenship education program. Citizenship education is now compulsory in UK schools up to 14 and is often available as an option beyond that age.

In Scotland, UK, active citizenship has been one of the three major themes of community policy since The Osler Report (section 6.6) in 1998. The Scottish Government's 2009 guidelines for community learning and development, Working and Learning Together, has active citizenship as a target within other policy aims. Britain has a points-based immigration system, and in 2009 was considering a probationary period for newly admitted immigrants which would examine, in part, how well they were being so-called active citizens.

In Denmark, active citizenship is part of the curriculum in Danish teacher's education. The course is defined as 36 lessons.

In Canada, there is an Active Citizenship Course being run at Mohawk College in Hamilton, Ontario. It is a compulsory course that is delivered by the Language Studies Department to all students at the college.

In the United States, writer Catherine Crier wondered in the Huffington Post about whether Americans had lost sight of Thomas Jefferson's sense of active citizenship. Crier lamented how Americans have tended to neglect participating in voluntary associations, and tend to live as "strangers apart from the rest", quoting Tocqueville. In contrast, writer Eboo Patel in Newsweek suggested that President Obama had a somewhat different sense of active citizenship, meaning strong families, a vibrant civic center in which persons of different faiths and secular backgrounds work together, with government acting as a "catalyst".

Jose Antonio Vargas writes in his memoirs, Dear America: Notes from an Undocumented Citizen, that undocumented immigrants, who contribute to the cultural, social, and economic fabrics of their adopted countries, are and ought to be considered citizens of those countries, notwithstanding what immigration authorities call them. He calls this a "citizenship of participation".

== See also ==
- Civic awareness
- Civic studies
- Common good
- Intentional living
- Junior Chamber International
- Life stance
- Liquid democracy
- Participatory democracy
