= Black Voters Matter =

American voting rights organization

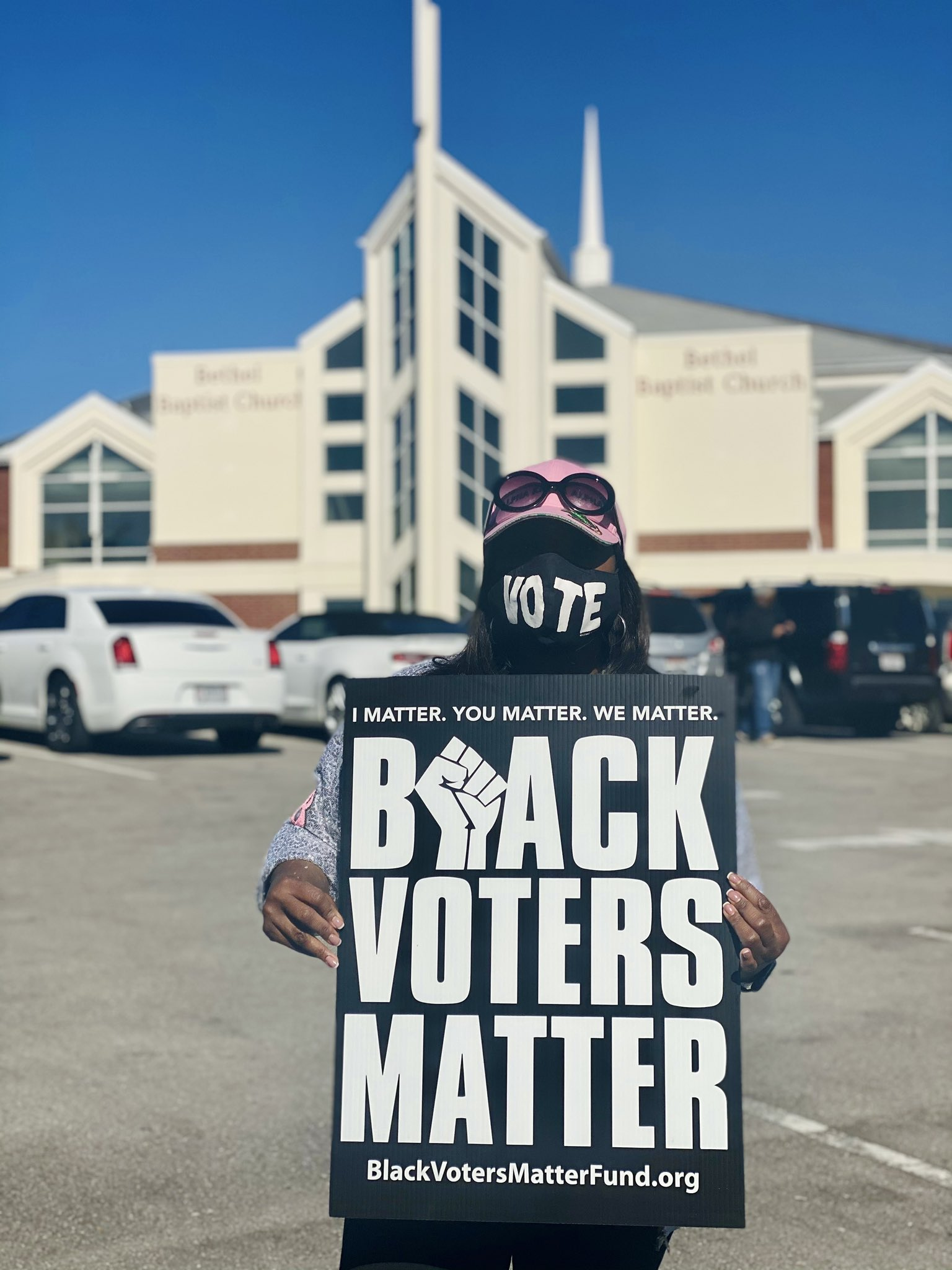
- Abbreviation: BVM
- Formation: 2016
- Founder: LaTosha Brown; Cliff Albright
- Legal status: 501(c)(4)
- Purpose: To increase power in marginalized, predominantly Black communities
- Website: blackvotersmatterfund.org

Black Voters Matter (BVM) is an American 501(c)(4) voting rights and community empowerment organization. BVM's stated purpose is "to increase power in our communities" by focusing on voter registration, getting out the vote, independent election-related expenditures, and organizational development & training for other grassroots groups. Founded by activists LaTosha Brown and Cliff Albright in 2016, BVM was involved in the election of United States Senator Doug Jones of Alabama in 2017, the 2020–21 United States Senate election in Georgia and the 2020–21 United States Senate special election in Georgia.

== Background ==
Black Voters Matter was founded by LaTosha Brown and Cliff Albright in 2016 "to center stories of community members directly connected to issues" and "to partner with activists already established in local communities." As of November 2020, the group operated in Florida, South Carolina, Tennessee, Georgia, Louisiana, North Carolina, Pennsylvania, Alabama and Mississippi. In addition to voter registration and get out the vote efforts, BVM focuses on policy advocacy, including expanding early voting, resisting voter ID laws and upholding and strengthening the Voting Rights Act of 1965; organizational development and training of other grassroots groups; and financial support of related election activities. BVM works with non-partisan VoteRiders to spread state-specific information on voter ID requirements.

The organization generally focuses in areas where at least 15% of the electorate is Black.

Institutional and corporate partners are collaborating to combine financial, volunteer, marketing, and other resources to raise awareness of Black voting rights and broader community issues. These efforts include advocacy from America Votes, multi-year grants awarded by the Southern Poverty Law Center (SPLC), a 5-year grant from the Open Society Foundations, BET's partnership in the #ReclaimYourVote 2022 campaign, MTV’s “Rock the Vote” support to mobilize student voters, and Oprah Winfrey's Own Your Vote initiative supporting voter education programs. In 2022, Ben & Jerry's rebranded its Cold Brew Coffee flavor to "Change is Brewing", to support voter engagement efforts led by Black Voters Matter. BVM has also partnered with BET Media Group and the National Urban League to encourage Black community involvement in voter registration and participation.

=== Doug Jones campaign ===
Black Voters Matter participated in voter outreach during the 2017 special election that resulted in Doug Jones' election to the United States Senate from Alabama. Jones was the first Democrat to fill the seat since 1992, and Black voter turnout was especially notable in the election, with 98% of Black women casting votes for Jones.

During and after Jones' victory, BVM shifted its focus to rural Black communities in the South rather than in urban areas and joined a coalition of Black women's groups working to increase voter turnout in 2018.

== 2020–2021 Georgia elections ==
BVM is credited with increasing Black voter turnout in the 2020–21 Georgia state elections, including the 2021 U.S. Senate runoffs won by Reverend Raphael Warnock and Jon Ossoff.

=== Effects of COVID-19 ===
BVM co-founder LaTosha Brown credits years of organizing for the organization's ability to operate effectively during the COVID-19 pandemic and the 2020 election cycle. She explained to Time in September 2020 that had BVM not developed relationships and recognition with voters throughout 2017, 2018 and 2019, they would have been attempting to reach voters who had never heard of them or built any sort of trust with the organization and would therefore not have had such a significant impact on the election.

The organization also substituted in-person events with town halls via Zoom, which were held multiple times a week and drew as many as 1,000 people.

=== Bus tours ===
The Black Voters Matter Fund and its partners have participated in several bus tours throughout the Southern United States and prominent swing states to "galvanize voters and stop voter suppression." The bus's first tour, "The South is Rising", visited rural areas of four states. In 2019, it made more than 20 trips, and in 2020, the "We Got Power" tour visited Alabama, Mississippi, Tennessee, North Carolina and California. Initial plans for 2020 were more expansive, but due to the COVID-19 pandemic, BVM moved a lot of their contact to virtual town halls. A large QR code was painted on the side of the bus to disperse voter information without necessitating close contact.

Brown estimates that BVM made contact with at least 10 million Black voters during the 2020 election cycle bus tours.

In 2022, BVM's campaigns were broadly covered by print and television media. The “Take the Field Tour” campaign was primarily focused on historically Black colleges and universities (HBCUs) in Texas with the objective to empower students to take up issues such as voting rights, campaign finance reform, and the elimination of student debt on college campuses nationwide. The "We Won't Black Down" campaign and bus tour goal was to promote democracy in action ahead of the 2022 general election. The national tour included stops in states: North Carolina, Georgia, Texas, Missouri, Pennsylvania, Wisconsin, Michigan, Ohio, and Florida.

The tour bus does not operate only for national- and state-level elections; like BVM itself, tours take place for local-level elections in individual towns and cities. As BVM organizers explained to the Los Angeles Times in March 2021, working at the local level enables them to support individuals who may eventually seek state and national offices.

=== Voting Lines ===
Black Voters Matter volunteers who provided food and water to voters waiting in line to vote in the 2020 election did not violate any laws according to the Georgia State Election Board. Voting law SB 202 explicitly prevents non-poll workers from distributing food and water was not in effect yet.

== 2024 Presidential election ==
Black Voters Matter has been active in South Carolina providing voter education and motivation.

== Local support ==
BVM actively supports infrastructure for grassroots organizations in rural Black communities pursuing voting rights initiatives, providing financial support, training, candidate development, and networking. In the 2020 election cycle, BVM supported more than 600 Black-led grassroots groups in 12 states. As of November 2020, they had invested in over 500 Black-led community organizations, and describe advocating for voting rights "in a way that's about power and not just about participation."

== Humanitarian aid ==
Throughout its tenure, BVM has initiated humanitarian aid projects in the communities it serves. When widespread closures began due to the COVID-19 pandemic in the United States, the Black Voters Matter Fund established a COVID-19 fund and raised just under $400,000 to serve high-risk communities and to pressure governors not to reopen before it was safe to do so. Following the 2020 murder of George Floyd, the BLM Fund donated over $250,000 to bail funds for individuals arrested while protesting the murder and police brutality in the United States. Following the 2021 Texas power crisis, the fund donated $50,000 to a snow and water emergency fund for Texas communities. A 2020 profile by The 19th explained that "the organization is focused not just on the race—registering and turning out thousands of voters—or even on the candidates themselves, but on feeding nearly 20,000 families, offering free coronavirus testing and continuing to support struggling areas of the state, whether they end up casting a ballot or not."

== Acknowledgements and awards ==
Black Voters Matter co-founder, LaTosha Brown, received the Ms. Foundation’s Women of Vision Award, as the nation's oldest women's foundation marked its half century anniversary.
