= Cooperative Election Study =

Large American electoral survey

The Cooperative Election Study (abbreviated CES) (formerly the Cooperative Congressional Election Study, abbreviated CCES) is a national online survey conducted before and after United States presidential and midterm elections. Originally designed by Stephen Ansolabehere of Harvard University, it was originally fielded in 2006 by the Palo Alto, California-based company Polimetrix, Inc., with help from 39 different American universities. Its original goal was to survey voters in the 2006 midterm elections. When it was begun, it was the largest survey of Congressional elections ever, with over 36,500 participants in its first wave alone.

== Methodology ==
The pre-election phase of the CES involves administering the first two-thirds of the questionnaire from late September to late October. The post-election phase involves administering the remaining one-third of the survey in November, most of which pertains to the election that had just happened.
