= Richard Hasen =

American legal scholar

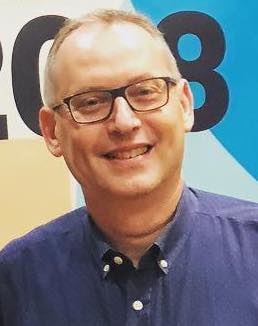
- Rick Hasen in 2018 at South by Southwest
- Education: University of California, Berkeley (BA); University of California, Los Angeles (MA, PhD, JD)
- Known for: Legislation; Election law Campaign finance

Richard L. Hasen is an American legal scholar and law professor at the University of California, Los Angeles. He is an expert in legislation, election law and campaign finance.

== Education ==
Hasen received a Bachelor of Arts with highest honors (in Middle Eastern studies) from the University of California, Berkeley in 1986. He received a Master of Arts with distinction (in political science) in 1988, and a Doctor of Philosophy in political science in 1992, both from the University of California, Los Angeles. He received his Juris Doctor from UCLA School of Law in 1991, and was elected to the Order of the Coif.

== Career ==
Hasen was a law clerk to Judge David R. Thompson of the United States Court of Appeals for the Ninth Circuit from 1991 to 1992 before joining the law firm of Horvitz & Levy LLP, in Encino, California.

He taught at the Chicago-Kent College of Law from 1994 to 1997. In 1998 he took a position at Loyola Law School, Los Angeles; in 2005, he was named by Loyola as the William H. Hannon Distinguished Professor of Law. He left Loyola to become a professor at the University of California, Irvine School of Law in July 2011.

Hasen was one of the founding co-editors of the quarterly Election Law Journal, a peer reviewed publication on election law. He also runs ElectionLawBlog, a blog focusing on election law, election security, campaign finance, voting rights, ballot initiatives, redistricting, and other legal issues.

In 2009, Hasen was elected to the American Law Institute. In 2013, the National Law Journal included Hasen on its list of the "100 most influential lawyers in America."

In 2022, Hasen joined the faculty at UCLA School of Law.

== Books ==
- Hasen, Richard L. (August 14, 2012). The Voting Wars: From Florida 2000 to the Next Election Meltdown. Yale University Press. ISBN 978-0-300-18421-1. JSTOR j.ctt32bft8. OCLC 808341874.
- Hasen, Richard L. (January 12, 2016). Plutocrats United: Campaign Money, the Supreme Court, and the Distortion of American Elections. Yale University Press. ISBN 978-0-300-21674-5. OCLC 936378410.
- Hasen, Richard L. (March 20, 2018). The Justice of Contradictions: Antonin Scalia and the Politics of Disruption. Yale University Press. ISBN 978-0-300-22864-9. OCLC 1002129887.
- Hasen, Richard L. (February 4, 2020). Election Meltdown: Dirty Tricks, Distrust, and the Threat to American Democracy. Yale University Press. doi:10.2307/j.ctvw1d4ww. ISBN 978-0-300-24819-7. JSTOR j.ctvw1d4ww. OCLC 1111981022. S2CID 243732678.
- Hasen, Richard L. (March 8, 2022). Cheap Speech: How Disinformation Poisons Our Politics―and How to Cure It. Yale University Press. ISBN 978-0-300-25937-7.
- Hasen, Richard L. (February 20, 2024). A Real Right to Vote: How a Constitutional Amendment Can Safeguard American Democracy. Princeton University Press. ISBN 9780691257716.
