= Universal suffrage =

Right of every person to an equal say in politics

Universal suffrage lexical

Universal suffrage or universal franchise refers to the right to vote being available for all adults within a jurisdiction. The idea is often endorsed by the slogan "one man, one vote".

For many, the term universal suffrage assumes the exclusion of the young and non-citizens (among others). At the same time, some insist that more inclusion is needed before suffrage can be truly universal. Democratic theorists, especially those hoping to achieve more universal suffrage, support presumptive inclusion, where the legal system would protect the voting rights of all subjects unless the government can clearly prove that disenfranchisement is necessary. Universal full suffrage includes both the right to vote, also called active suffrage, and the right to be elected, also called passive suffrage.

== History ==
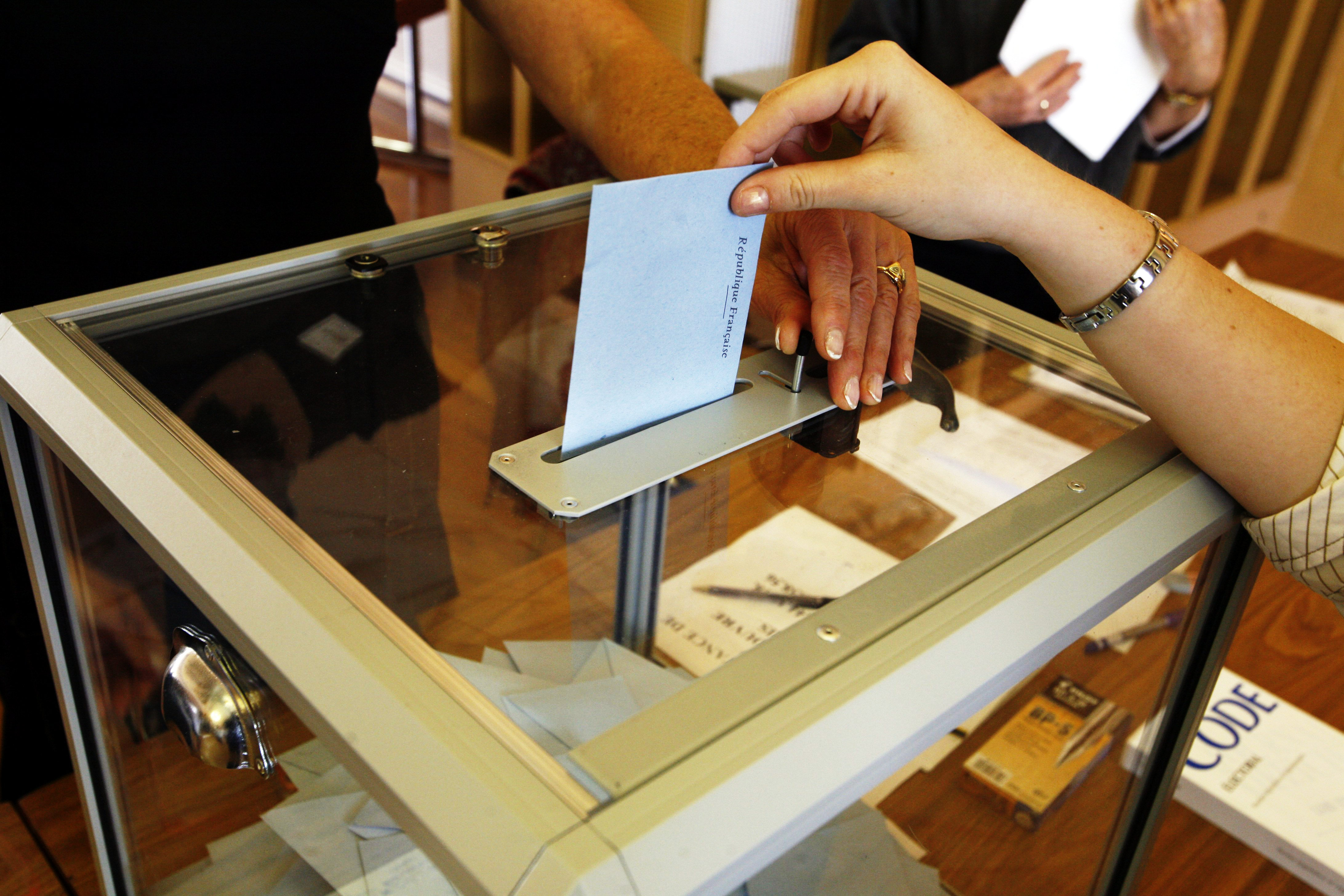
Voting is an important part of the formal democratic process.

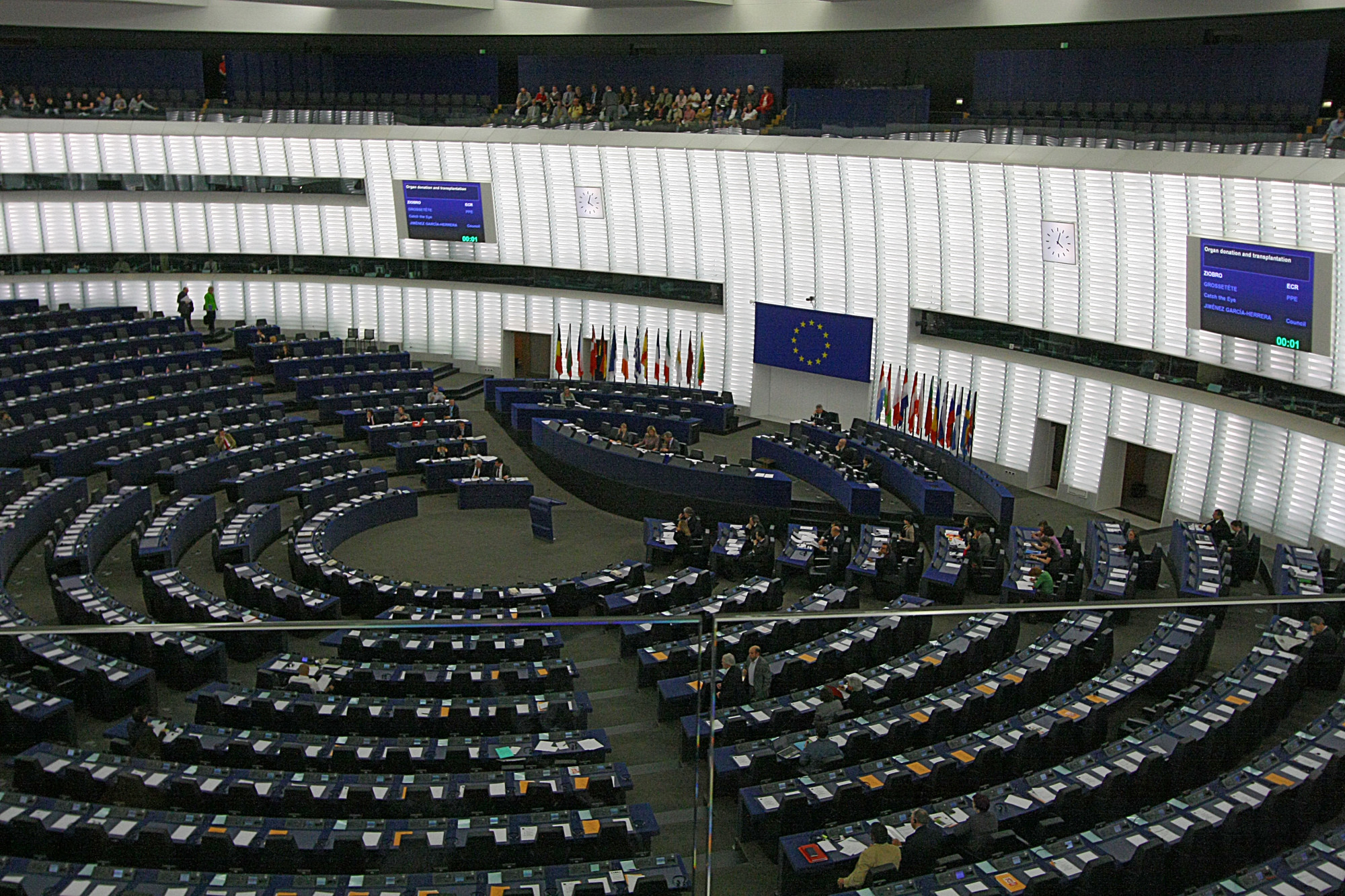
The European Parliament is the only international organ elected with universal suffrage (since 1979).

In the first modern democracies, governments restricted the vote to those with property and wealth, which almost always meant a minority of the male population. In some jurisdictions, other restrictions existed, such as requiring voters to practice a given religion. In all modern democracies, the number of people who could vote has increased progressively with time. The 19th century saw many movements advocating "universal [male] suffrage", most notably in Europe and North America. Female suffrage was largely ignored until the latter half of the century, when movements began to thrive; the first of these was in New Zealand, in which all adult women of all ethnicities gained the right to vote in 1893. A year later, South Australia granted all citizens the right to vote and stand for election, making it the first place in the world where women could stand as candidates for election to parliament. From there, this groundbreaking reform set a precedent for broader suffrage rights worldwide. However, voting rights were often limited to those of the dominant ethnicity.

In the United States, after the principle of "One person, one vote" was established in the early 1960s by the U.S. Supreme Court under Earl Warren, the U.S. Congress, together with the Warren Court, continued to protect and expand the voting rights of all Americans, especially African Americans, through the Civil Rights Act of 1964, Voting Rights Act of 1965 and several Supreme Court rulings. In addition, the term "suffrage" is also associated specifically with women's suffrage in the United States; a movement to extend the franchise to women began in the mid-19th century and culminated in 1920, when the United States ratified the Nineteenth Amendment to the United States Constitution, guaranteeing the right of women to vote. It would be 1928 before voting rights were guaranteed to all women in the UK.

France, under the 1793 Jacobin constitution, was the first major country to enact suffrage for all adult males, though it was never formally used in practice (the constitution was immediately suspended before being implemented, and the subsequent election occurred in 1795 after the fall of the Jacobin government in 1794 discredited most ideas associated with them, including that constitution). Elsewhere in the Francophone world, the Republic of Haiti legislated for universal male suffrage in 1816. The Second French Republic instituted adult male suffrage after the revolution of 1848.

Following the French revolutions, movements in the Western world toward more universal suffrage occurred in the early 19th century, and focused on removing property requirements for voting. In 1867 Germany (the North German Confederation) enacted suffrage for all adult males. In the United States following the American Civil War, slaves were freed and granted rights of citizens, including suffrage for adult males (although several states established restrictions largely, though not completely, diminishing these rights). In the late-19th and early-20th centuries, the focus of the universal suffrage movement came to include the extension of the right to vote to women, as happened from the post-Civil War era in several Western states and during the 1890s in a number of British colonies.

On 19 September 1893 the British Governor of New Zealand, Lord Glasgow, gave assent to a new electoral act, which meant that New Zealand became the first British-controlled colony in which women had the right to vote in parliamentary elections. This was followed shortly after by the colony of South Australia in 1894, which was the second to allow women to vote, but the first colony to permit women to stand for election as well. In 1906, the autonomous Russian territory known as Grand Duchy of Finland (which became the Republic of Finland in 1917) became the first territory in the world to implement unrestricted universal suffrage, as women could stand as candidates, unlike in New Zealand, and without indigenous ethnic exclusion, like in Australia. It also led to the election of the world's first female members of parliament the following year. Federal states and colonial or autonomous territories prior to World War I have multiple examples of early introduction of universal suffrage. However, these legal changes were effected with the permission of the British, Russian or other government bodies, which were considered the sovereign nation at the time. For this reason, Australia (1901), New Zealand (1908) and Finland (1917) all have different dates of achieving independent nationhood.

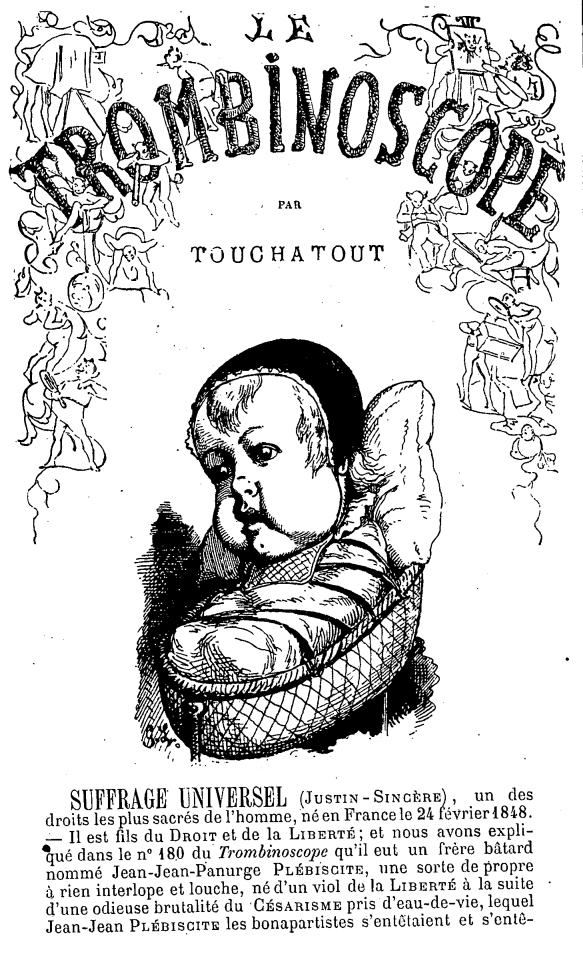
Satirical drawing by Touchatout depicting the birth of universal suffrage, "one of the most sacred rights of Man, born in France on 24 february 1848."

The French First Republic adopted universal male suffrage briefly in 1792; it was one of the first national systems that abolished all property requirements as a prerequisite for allowing men to register and vote. Greece recognized full male suffrage in 1844. Spain recognized it in the Constitution of 1869 and France and Switzerland have continuously done so since the 1848 Revolution (for resident male citizens). Upon independence in the 19th century, several Latin-American countries and Liberia in Africa initially extended suffrage to all adult males, but subsequently restricted it based on property requirements. The German Empire implemented full male suffrage in 1871.

In the United States, the Fifteenth Amendment to the United States Constitution, ratified in 1870 during the Reconstruction era, provided that "The right of citizens of the United States to vote shall not be denied or abridged by the United States or by any State on account of race, color, or previous condition of servitude." This amendment aimed to guarantee the right to vote to African Americans, many of whom had been enslaved in the South prior to the end (1865) of the American Civil War and the 1864–1865 abolition of slavery. Despite the amendment, however, blacks were disfranchised in the former Confederate states after 1877; Southern officials ignored the amendment and blocked black citizens from voting through a variety of devices, including poll taxes, literacy tests, and grandfather clauses; violence and terrorism were used to intimidate some would-be voters. Southern blacks did not effectively receive the right to vote until the Voting Rights Act of 1965.

In 1893 the self-governing colony New Zealand became the first country in the world (except for the short-lived 18th-century Corsican Republic) to grant active universal suffrage by giving women the right to vote. It did not grant universal full suffrage (the right to both vote and be a candidate, or both active and passive suffrage) until 1919.

In 1902, the Commonwealth of Australia became the first country to grant full suffrage for women, i.e. the rights both to vote and to run for office. However, Australia did not implement universal suffrage at this time – nationwide voting rights for Aboriginal Australians were not established until 1962, before that varying by state.

Many societies in the past have denied or abridged Political representation on the basis of race or ethnicity, related to discriminatory ideas about citizenship. For example, in apartheid-era South Africa, non-White people could generally not vote in national elections until the first multi-party elections in 1994. However, a nonracial franchise existed under the Cape Qualified Franchise, which was replaced by a number of separate MPs in 1936 (Blacks) and 1958 (Coloureds). Later, the Tricameral Parliament established separate chambers for Whites, Coloureds and Indians. Rhodesia enacted a similar statute to the former in its proclaimed independence of 1965, which however allowed a smaller number of representatives for the considerably larger Black majority (under its 1961 constitution, the voting classes had been based on socio-economic standards, which marginalized most Black and a few White voters to a separate set of constituencies, under the principle of weighted voting; this was replaced in 1969 by an explicitly racial franchise, with delegated all Blacks to the 'B' voters roll).

== Women's suffrage ==
Universal suffrage women lexical

Universal suffrage men lexical

In Sweden (including Swedish-ruled Finland), women's suffrage was granted during the Age of Liberty from 1718 until 1772.

In Corsica, women's suffrage was granted in 1755 and lasted until 1769.

Women's suffrage (with the same property qualifications as for men) was granted in New Jersey in 1776 (the word "inhabitants" was used instead of "men" in the 1776 Constitution) and rescinded in 1807, supplanting qualified franchise for universal manhood suffrage.

The Pitcairn Islands granted restricted women's suffrage in 1838. Various other countries and states granted restricted women's suffrage in the later half of the nineteenth century, starting with South Australia in 1861.

The first unrestricted women's suffrage in a major country was granted in New Zealand in 1893. The women's suffrage bill was adopted mere weeks before the general election of 1893. Māori men had been granted suffrage in 1867, white men in 1879. The Freedom in the World index lists New Zealand as the only free country in the world in 1893.

South Australia first granted women suffrage and allowed them to stand for parliament in 1894.

In 1906, the autonomous Grand Duchy of Finland became the first territory to give women full political rights, i.e. both the right to vote and to run for office, and was the second in the world and the first in Europe to give women the right to vote. The world's first female members of parliament were elected in Finland the following year, 1907. At the time, however, Finland was not a sovereign state but ultimately under the rule of the Russian Empire until independence as a republic in 1917–18.

After the German Revolution of 1918–19, the Weimar Constitution established universal suffrage in 1919 with a minimum voting age of 20.

The UK gave women the right to vote at the same age as men (21) in 1928.

In 1931, the Second Spanish Republic allowed women the right of passive suffrage with three women being elected. After the fall of the republic, both men and especially women exercised very limited suffrage until the general elections in 1977.

During a discussion on extending women's right to active suffrage, the Radical Socialist Victoria Kent confronted the Radical Clara Campoamor. Kent argued that Spanish women were not yet prepared to vote and, since they were too influenced by the Catholic Church, they would vote for right-wing candidates. Campoamor however pleaded for women's rights regardless of political orientation. Her point finally prevailed and, in the election of 1933, the political right won with the vote of citizens of any sex over 23. Both Campoamor and Kent lost their seats.

In Switzerland, women's suffrage was introduced at the federal level, by a nationwide (male) referendum in 1971, but the referendum did not give women the right to vote at the cantonal level. The Cantons independently voted to grant women the right to vote. The first Canton to give women the right to vote was Vaud in 1959. The last Canton, Appenzell Innerrhoden, had a centuries-old law forbidding women to vote. This was only changed in 1990 when Switzerland's Federal Court ordered the Canton to grant women the right to vote.

== Youth suffrage ==
The movement to lower the voting age many consider an aspect of universal suffrage that the youth rights movement has helped to lead. Organizations such as the National Youth Rights Association are active in the United States to advocate for a lower voting age, with some success, among other issues related to youth rights. A related movement, suffrage for Americans with disabilities provides important precedents and intersectionality with the movement to extend voting rights to children and youth.

== Non-resident citizen voting ==
Some jurisdictions don't require one to be present in their country of citizenship to vote.

== Multiple citizenship and non-citizen suffrage ==
Some persons have the right to vote in multiple countries due to multiple citizenship or due to non-citizen suffrage and residency status.

== Dates by country ==
States have granted and revoked universal suffrage at various times.

Note: this chart does not indicate periods of autocratic rule (when voting has little or no power).

- Adult citizens There are no distinctions between citizens over a certain age in any part of its territories due to gender, literacy, wealth, social status, religion, race, or ethnicity.
- Male is for all males over a certain age in the majority ethnic or sectarian group irrespective of literacy, wealth, or social status.
- Female is for when all women over a certain age can vote on the same terms as men.
- Ethnicity is for when all eligible voters over a certain age can vote on the same terms as the majority or politically dominant group irrespective of religion, race, or ethnicity.

Since historically one group or another might have lost suffrage rights only to regain them later on, this table lists the last uninterrupted time from the present a group was granted the right to vote if that group's suffrage has been fully restored.

Suffrage milestones by country or territory
Country or territory	Adult citizens	Male	Female	Ethnicity	Notes
Afghanistan	2004	2004	2004	2004	In 1919 King Amanullah Khan "created Afghanistan's first constitution, which abolished slavery, created a legislature, guaranteed secular education, and instituted equal rights for men and women." By 1929 he was overthrown along with his constitution, and all voting rights were removed. The 1964 Constitution of Afghanistan transformed Afghanistan into a modern democracy. In 1979, the Soviet Union invaded Afghanistan and toppled the government, withdrawing in 1989. The Taliban took control of the government in 1996. However, it wasn't until after the U.S. invasion of Afghanistan that people regained the right to vote in 2004.
Argentina	1952	1853	1952	1853	Universal male suffrage was instituted in 1853. Universal, secret and mandatory suffrage for male citizens over 18 years of age was granted by the Sáenz Peña Law (General Election Law) of 1912. It was amended to include female citizens in 1947 but became effective in 1952.
Armenia	1919	1919	1919	1919	Since the establishment of the First Republic of Armenia. 21 and 23 June 1919, first direct parliamentary elections were held in Armenia under universal suffrage - every person over the age of 20 had the right to vote regardless of gender, ethnicity or religious beliefs and 3 women were elected as MPs.
Australia	1965	1901	1902	1965	In 1856, the parliament of the self-governing Colony of South Australia enacted legislation providing for universal male suffrage for all male residents over the age of 21. The parliaments of the Colony of Victoria and the Colony of New South Wales followed suit by enacting legislation providing universal male suffrage in 1857 and 1858, respectively. In 1894, the parliament of the Colony of South Australia enacted legislation providing female adults franchise; giving all adults of the age of majority the right to vote in elections, and for any elector to stand for high office. In 1901, the self-governing colonies of Australia federated. In 1902, the new federal parliament legislated for an adult franchise and the right of electors to stand for and occupy any office for which they could directly vote. This franchise, including voting rights for non-Indigenous women, was established by the Commonwealth Franchise Act 1902. Voting rights for Indigenous Australians varied depending on state legislation. The Commonwealth Electoral Act 1962 granted Indigenous Australians the right to vote in federal elections. In 1965, the Queensland parliament extended voting rights to all Aboriginals and Torres Strait Islanders. Compulsory enrolment was extended to Indigenous Australians nationwide in 1984.
Austria	1918	1896	1918	1907	Universal suffrage 1896, universal and equal suffrage (removing multiple voting) 1907. Before 1907 unmarried landholding women were allowed to vote. After the Central Powers' defeat in World War I universal suffrage including women.
Azerbaijan	1919	1919	1919	1919	Soviet invasion of Azerbaijan by the nascent Soviet Russia (Note: While the USSR was not formally founded until 1922, a group of socialist republics under the influence of Soviet Russia existed for several years before that.) in 1920.
Bahamas	1961	1958	1961	1807	Legislation passed in the house in 1961 allowing for Universal adult suffrage in The Bahamas. All men could vote equally in The Bahamas in 1958. In 1807 legislation passed in the house of assembly giving free persons of color the right to vote. Electorate is less than half of citizenry.
Bahrain	1975	1975	1975	–	Universal suffrage in 1973, although parliament was suspended and dissolved in 1975 for approximately 30 years.
Barbados	1951	1951	1951	1831	In 1831, legislation passed in the house of assembly giving free men of color the right to vote with an income qualification stipulation . In 1943, women were given the right to vote as men as long as they passed the income qualification. Legislation passed in the house in 1951 allowing for universal adult suffrage in Barbados. In 1964, voting age was reduced from age 21 to 18.
Belgium	1948	1893	1948	1893	Universal census suffrage for all men aged 25 and above since 1893. Depending on education and amount of taxes paid, males could cast between 1 and 3 votes. Widows were also allowed to vote but lost their voting rights after remarrying. Universal single suffrage for males since 1918. Universal suffrage for women was finally introduced in 1948.
Bhutan	2008	2008	2008	2008	
Bolivia	1952	1938	1952	1952	Universal suffrage granted by decree of 1952; first elections in 1956; women's suffrage coincided with abolition of literacy requirements.
Brazil	1985	1891	1932	1891	Male suffrage from Brazilian Constitution of 1891 excluding beggars, women, illiterates, lowest ranking soldiers and members of monastic orders. Women from 1932. Suffrage was further expanded to all but illiterate people in 1946. Illiterates remained without the right to vote until 1985.
Brunei	–	–	–	–	No elections.
Bulgaria	1945	1879	1945	1879	Universal suffrage including women and men serving in the Army was instituted by the government of the Fatherland front.
Burma/Myanmar	1990	1990	1990	1990	Last free elections held in 1990. New elections held in 2015, which elected 75% of legislators, while 25% remain appointed by the military.
Canada	1960	1920	1920	1960	In 1920, Canada enacted suffrage for federal elections for male and female citizens, with exceptions for Chinese Canadians and Aboriginal Canadians; for provincial elections, female suffrage was established between 1916 (Manitoba, Alberta, Saskatchewan) and 1940 (Quebec). Chinese Canadians, regardless of gender, were given suffrage in 1947, while Aboriginal Canadians were not allowed to vote until 1960, regardless of gender. Newfoundland which joined Canada in 1949 had universal male suffrage in 1925.
Chile	1970	1970	1970	1970	From 1888 suffrage for men of any race over 21 who can read. From 1925 full suffrage for men aged 21 and above and able to read and write. 1934 women get to vote on Municipal Elections. From 1949 universal suffrage for men and women aged 21 and above and able to read and write. From 1970 suffrage for men and women aged 18 and older whether or not they can read.
China	1953	1947	1953	1947	Officially Universal suffrage was granted under the 1947 Constitution of the Republic of China when the First National Assembly (disbanded 2005) elections were held in 1947. But women were not explicitly enfranchised until 1953 thanks to the first Electoral Law of the People's Republic of China. The general populace can only vote for local elections. National elections for president and premier are held by the National People's Congress. Taiwan had the first multi-party legislative elections in 1992 and the first presidential election in 1996.
Colombia	1954	1936	1954	1936	Universal male suffrage started in 1853, restricted in 1886. Electorate defined on the basis of adult franchise and joint electorate.
First Czechoslovak Republic	1918	1896	1918	1896	Within Austria, universal suffrage 1896, universal and equal suffrage (removing multiple voting) 1907. After the Central Powers' defeat in World War I, universal suffrage including women.
Denmark	1915	1849	1915	1849	The King granted limited voting rights in 1834 but only to property owners and with limited power. First proper voting rights came in 1849 to "men over 30 of good reputation" but in the subsequent years the rules were changed a number of times, and it was not until the change of the constitution in 1915 that all men and women living within the kingdom had influence on all chambers. Danish law does not operate with any notion of "ethnicity", but non-resident citizens are still excluded from voting after two years abroad.
Dominican Republic	2015				Jorge Radhamés Zorrilla Ozuna proposed the inclusion of the military vote in the constitutional reform of Dominican Republic, to be effective in the elections of 2016.
Ecuador			1929		
Estonia	1918	1917	1918	1917	Two tiered elections were held, with 62 representatives from rural communities and towns elected in May–June and July–August, respectively.
European Union	1979	1979	1979	1979	Elections to the European Parliament have taken place since 1979.
Finland	1906	1906	1906	1906	As an autonomous Grand Principality in the Russian Empire, Finland achieved universal suffrage in 1906, becoming the second country in the world to adopt universal suffrage. The Finnish parliamentary election of 1907 was the first time when women were elected (19 of 200 MPs). After becoming independent in 1917, Finland continued its universal suffrage.
France	1945 (Note: Over the years suffrage increased and decreased based on the introduction, repeal and reintroduction of various degrees of universal, property and census-based suffrage. Universal male suffrage was given in 1848 and in 1944 women had equal universal suffrage rights to men. The military obtained the right to vote in 1945.)	1848	1944	1792 (Note: In 1792, the Convention assembly was elected by all French males 21 and over regardless of one's ethnicity. While not an ethnicity, those serving in the military obtained the right to vote in 1945.)	In 1792, the Convention assembly was elected by all French males 21 and over. Over the subsequent years, France experienced profound political upheaval, with republican, monarchist and bonapartist government governing at various times. Through these changes, suffrage increased and decreased based on the introduction, repeal and reintroduction of various degrees of universal, property and census-based suffrage. Universal male suffrage was given in 1848, with the exception of the military who obtained the right to vote in 1945. This was supplemented in 1944 by full universal suffrage, including women as voters.
Georgia	1919	1919	1919	1919	The first democratic elections were held on 14–16 February 1919. Five women were elected in total (for Menshevik party) to take part in national legislature numbering 130MPs. In 1921, Georgia became a part of the nascent Soviet Union.
Germany	1919	1871	1919	1919	The German Empire from 1871 until 1918 (and the North German Confederation before it from 1867) had universal male suffrage, one of the more progressive election franchises at the time. After the German Revolution of 1918–19, the Weimar Constitution established universal suffrage in 1919 with a minimum voting age of 20.
Ghana	1951	1951	1951	1951	Universal suffrage was granted for the 1951 legislative election. This was the first election to be held in Africa under universal suffrage.
Greece	1952	1844	1952	1844	After the Revolution of 3 September 1843, the Greek Constitution of 1844 with the electoral law of 18 March 1844 introduced universal male suffrage with secret ballot. Women were given the right to vote in local elections in 1930 and in parliamentary elections since 1952.
Hong Kong	1991	1991	1991	1991	Held its first legislative elections in 1991, electing part of the legislators. However currently, less than a quarter of the seats in its Legislative Council are elected via universal suffrage, the rest being functional constituencies elected by trade groups and seats held by those elected by the establishment-controlled Election Committee.
Hungary	1918	1918	1918	1867	After the Central Powers' defeat in World War I. Somewhat reverted in 1925: women's voting age raised to 30, education and wealth requirements were raised. In rural constituencies open voting was reinstated. The rate of eligible citizens fell to 29%.
Iceland	1920	1920	1920	1920	A small proportion of men were given the right to vote in the 1844 Althing elections. A small proportion of women were granted the right to vote in local elections in 1882. Women's suffrage was proposed in the Althing in 1911, ratified by the Althing in 1913, and enacted on 19 June 1915 by the Danish king; but this only granted the vote to women over 40, and did not grant the right to vote to servants. These restrictions (along with some restrictions on male suffrage) were lifted in 1920 after Iceland became an independent state under the Danish crown in 1918.
India	1950	1950	1950	1950	All adult citizens as recognized by the Constitution of India, irrespective of race or gender or religion on the founding of the Republic of India.
Indonesia	1955	1955	1955	1955	
Iran	1963	1906	1963	1906	Under "Constitutional Revolution". The White Revolution gave women the right to vote in 1963.
Ireland	1923	1918	1923	1793	The Roman Catholic Relief Act 1793 (Note: the Roman Catholic Relief Act 1829 reflects eligibility for office, not the eligibility to vote.) removed the voting ban from Catholic men in the Kingdom of Ireland. All adult men in the United Kingdom of Great Britain and Ireland were enfranchised by the Representation of the People Act 1918. This Act granted women over 30 the right to vote in national elections, (Note: Until the Reform Act 1832 specified "male persons", a few women had been able to vote in parliamentary elections through property ownership, although this was rare. In local government elections, women lost the right to vote under the Municipal Corporations Act 1835. Unmarried women ratepayers received the right to vote in the Municipal Franchise Act 1869. This right was confirmed in the Local Government Act 1894 and extended to include some married women. By 1900, over 1 million women were registered for local government elections in England.) but about 60% of women (those under 30 or not meeting property qualifications) were excluded until the Electoral Act 1923 in the Irish Free State changed previous British law to enfranchise women equally with men in 1923.
Israel	1948	1948	1948	1948	Universal suffrage since the founding of the State of Israel.
Italy	1945	1912	1945	1912	1912, introduction of the first universal male suffrage, extended to all citizens aged 30 and older, with no restrictions. It was applied in the elections of 1913. In 1918 the electorate was expanded with all male citizens aged 21 and older or who had served in the army. Universal adult suffrage, including women, introduced in 1945, and applied for the first time in the referendum of 1946. Suffrage for men and women aged 18 granted in 1975.
Jamaica	1944	1944	1944	1944	Universal adult suffrage introduced.
Japan	1945	1925	1945	1925	Universal adult male suffrage for those over 25 was introduced in 1925. Universal adult suffrage for both sexes over 20 introduced in 1945. The Voting age was reduced to 18 in 2016.
Kuwait	2005	1962	2005	1962	Universal adult male suffrage since 1962, for citizens who are 21 or older, with the exception of those who, at the time of elections, serve in the armed forces. As of 2005, women who satisfy the age and citizenship requirements are allowed to vote.
Latvia	1919	1919	1919	1919	Universal suffrage introduced in Law of elections to the Constituent assembly.
Lebanon	1943	1943	1943	1943	Universal suffrage for all adult males and females since the independence of Lebanon (The Chamber of Deputies is shared equally between Christians and Muslims, rather than elected by universal suffrage that would have provided a Muslim majority).
Liberia	1951	1946	1946	–	Liberia denies political rights for non-Black people. See: Liberian nationality law
Liechtenstein	1984	1921	1984		
Lithuania	1918	1918	1918	1918	2 November 1918, the Council of State of Lithuania approved the Fundamental Laws of the Provisional Constitution of the State of Lithuania. In this Provisional Constitution it said: "All citizens of the State, whatever their sex, nationality, religion or class, are equal before the law.", this implicitly establishes universal suffrage. Directly universal suffrage was enshrined in the Electoral Law of 30 October 1919.
Luxembourg	1919	1919	1919	1919	Universal voting rights introduced in May 1919, first applied in a referendum on 28 September, then the parliamentarian elections on 26 October 1919.
Malaysia	1957	1956	1957	1956	
Malta	1947	1947	1947	1947	The 1947 election was the first election without property qualifications for voters, and women were also allowed to vote for the first time.
Mauritius	1959	1948	1959	1948	The 1959 election was the first election when women were also allowed to vote for the first time. The 1948 Mauritian general election was the first instance when any adult who could write their names in any of the island's languages was allowed to vote, without property qualifications for voters.
Mexico	1953	1917	1953	1917	Universal suffrage given to men in 1917 after the Mexican Revolution; suffrage given to women in municipal elections in 1947 and national elections in 1953. In 1996, Mexicans living in the United States were given the right to vote in Mexican elections.
Netherlands	1919	1917	1919	1917	From 1917 full suffrage for men aged 23 and above. From 1919 universal suffrage for men and women aged 23. From 1971 suffrage for men and women aged 18 and older.
New Zealand	1893	1879	1893	1879	With the extension of voting rights to women in 1893, the self-governing British colony became one of the first permanently constituted jurisdictions in the world to grant universal adult suffrage, suffrage previously having been universal for Māori men over 21 from 1867, and for white men from 1879. Plural voting (impacting men) was abolished in 1889. Some adult prison inmates are denied the right to vote.
Norway	1913	1898	1913	1851	Full male suffrage in 1898, with women included in 1913. Tax-paying Sami men were granted suffrage in a revision of the constitution in 1821. The so-called Jew clause in the Constitution of 1814 explicitly banned Jews from entering and residing in the kingdom. It was repealed in 1851, paving the way for Jews to live, pay taxes and vote in Norway.
Pakistan	1956	1951	1956	1951	In 1956, women were granted the right to vote in national elections. Pakistan adopted universal adult suffrage for provisional assembly elections soon after it became independent in 1947. The first direct elections held in the country after independence were for the provincial Assembly of the Punjab from 10 to 20 March 1951.
Paraguay			1961		
Peru	1979	1979	1979	1979	Suffrage was granted for women in 1955 but suffrage for the illiterate was only granted with the 1979 Constitution.
Philippines	1946	1935	1937	1946	Males who were over 25 years old and could speak English or Spanish, with property and tax restrictions, were previously allowed to vote as early as 1907; universal male suffrage became a constitutional right in 1935. Women's suffrage was approved in a plebiscite in 1937.
Poland	1918	1918	1918	1918	Prior to the Partition of Poland in 1795, only nobility (men) were allowed to take part in political life. The first parliamentary elections were held on 26 January 1919 (1919 Polish legislative election), according to the decree introducing universal suffrage, signed by Józef Piłsudski on 28 November 1918, immediately after restoring independent Polish state. Universal suffrage for men and women over 21.
Portugal	1974	1974	1974	1974	By 1878, 72% of the male adult population had access to vote; this number was restricted by the policies of the last years of the monarchy and first years of the republic (transition in 1910 with the 5 October 1910 revolution), being reinstalled only in the 1920s. Restricted female suffrage was firstly allowed in 1931; it was further extended in 1933, 1946, and finally 1968. Due to the 1933–74 dictatorship of Estado Novo, universal suffrage was only fully attained after the 1974 Carnation revolution.
Qatar	1999	1999	1999		Municipal elections are open for active and passive participation for men and women since 1999.
Romania	1948	1918	1948	1918	The universal suffrage for men established by Royal Decree in November 1918, the first elections using universal suffrage took place in November 1919. Literate women were given the right to vote in the local elections in 1929 and the electoral law of 1939 extended the active voting rights to all literate citizens which were 30 years old or older. The universal suffrage was granted by the 1948 Constitution of Romania.
Russia	1917	1917	1917	1917	Universal suffrage established by Declaration of the Provisional Government of 15 March 1917 and Statute on Elections of the Constituent Assembly of 2 August 1917.
Samoa	1991	1990	1991	1990	
Saudi Arabia	2015	2005	2015	2005	Saudi Arabia is an authoritarian state. Men and women have the right to vote for half the seats in "virtually powerless" municipal councils.
Serbia	1945	1888	1945	1888	Suffrage for male voters who paid taxes was granted in the Constitution of 1869, and in the Constitution of 1888 the right to vote was given to all males of age 21. Women were allowed to vote with the Communist constitution of Yugoslavia.
South Africa	1994	1910	1931	1994	White women's suffrage granted in 1930 and suffrage for all white adults regardless of property in 1931. Universal suffrage not regarding race or colour of skin; many blacks and Coloureds were denied the right to vote before and during the apartheid era (1948–1994).
South Korea	1948	1948	1948	1948	Universal suffrage since the founding of the Republic of Korea. However, voting was initially limited to landowners and taxpayers in the larger towns, elders voting for everyone at the village level.
Spain	1933	1812	1933	1869	The Constitution of 1812 enfranchised all Spanish men of Iberian or indigenous American descent in both hemispheres irrespective of property, but explicitly excluded Afrodescendent men.; nevertheless, the Constitution was repealed with the restoration of Ferdinand VII in 1814. Recovered and extended to all men from 1869 to 1878 (comprising the Provisional Government, the Reign of Amadeo of Savoy, the First Spanish Republic and the three first years of Bourbon Restoration) and from 1890 to the end of the Second Spanish Republic (1931–36). On 19 November 1933 women were granted the right to vote. Revoked during Franco era (1939–75) and recovered since 1977 in the new Spanish Constitution.
Sri Lanka	1931	1931	1931	1931	Universal suffrage for all irrespective of race, ethnicity, language, or gender. Sri Lanka is the oldest democracy in Asia.
Sweden	1945	1909	1919	1873	During the years 1718–72 burgher men and women of age and with income were able to elect members of parliament, but women's suffrage was abolished in 1772. Jews were given the right to vote in 1838, but not given the right to stand for election until 1870. Catholics were given the right to vote in 1873, but not given the right to be eligible as cabinet minister until 1951. Full male suffrage 1909 for those aged 25 and above, but only to one of two equally weighed houses of parliament. Universal suffrage for men and women aged 23 enacted in 1919, and the first election took place in 1921. Until 1924 men who refused to do military service were excepted from universal suffrage. Until 1937 courts were able to punish crimes by revoking a convict's right to vote. Until 1945 persons living on benefits were excepted from universal suffrage. Voting age changed to 21 in 1945, to 20 in 1965, to 19 in 1969 and to 18 in 1975.
Switzerland	1971	1848	1971	1866	In the short-lived Helvetic Republic (1798–1803) men above the age of 20 had the right to vote. At the formation of today's federal state in 1848, Switzerland reintroduced universal male suffrage, but Jews did not have the same political rights as Christian citizens until 1866. Women's suffrage was introduced at the national level after a nationwide (male) referendum in 1971, but the referendum did not give women the right to vote at the cantonal level. Among the constituent states of the Old Swiss Confederacy, universal male suffrage is first attested in Uri in 1231, in Schwyz in 1294, in Unterwalden in 1309, and in Appenzell in 1403. In these rural communities all men fit for military service were allowed to participate in the Landsgemeinde, which managed political and judicial affairs. Women gained the right to vote in cantonal elections and referendums in the following years: 1959: Vaud, Neuchâtel; 1960: Genève; 1966: Basel-Stadt; 1968: Basel-Land; 1969: Ticino; 1970: Valais, Luzern, Zürich.; 1971: Aargau, Fribourg, Schaffhausen, Zug, Glarus, Solothurn, Bern, Thurgau.; 1972: St. Gallen, Uri, Schwyz, Graubünden, Nidwalden, Obwalden.; Appenzell Ausserrhoden only allowed women to vote in 1989, and the women of Appenzell Innerrhoden had to wait until 1990, when a ruling of the Federal Court forced the canton to let women participate in the Landsgemeinde.
Thailand	1933	1933	1933	1933	Thailand gave all villagers, men and women, the right to vote in local village elections in the "Local Administrative Act of May 1897" but not nationally. Universal suffrage for national elections was granted during the first general election in 1933.
Tunisia	1959		1957		Universal suffrage for all since the first post-independence constitution.
Turkey	1934	1876	1934	1876	
United Arab Emirates	–	2006	2006	2006	Limited suffrage for both men and women. A hand-picked 12% of Emirati citizens have the right to vote for half the members of the Federal National Council, an advisory quasi-parliamentary body. The UAE is an authoritarian state.
United Kingdom	1928	1918	1928	1791	The Roman Catholic Relief Act 1791 removed the dependence of voting rights on religion in the Kingdom of Great Britain. The right to vote has never since been based on race or religion. (Note: While local government gerrymandering in Northern Ireland was one of the factors which led to the Troubles, parliamentary elections still took place for all British citizens. In 1972 the British Parliament was unwilling to grant the mostly Protestant unionist Northern Ireland government more authoritarian special powers since it was now convinced of its inability to restore order. So they suspended the Parliament of Northern Ireland and the post of Governor and made provision for direct rule by the elected government of the United Kingdom.) All adult men in the United Kingdom of Great Britain and Ireland were enfranchised by the Representation of the People Act 1918. This Act granted women over 30 the right to vote in national elections, but about 60% of women (those under 30 or not meeting property qualifications) were excluded until the Equal Franchise Act 1928, when women were granted the vote on the same terms as men in the United Kingdom of Great Britain and Northern Ireland. The Representation of the People Act 1948 removed plural voting rights held by about 7% of the electorate. (Note: Graduates of universities lost the right to vote in university constituencies as well as parliamentary boroughs and property owners lost the right to vote both in the constituency where their property lay and that in which they lived, if the two were different. For elections to the Parliament of Northern Ireland, these changes were made under the Electoral Law Act 1968.) The Representation of the People Act 1969 reduced the voting age from 21 to 18, the first major democratic country to do so. As of 2019, 529,902 British nationals (257,646 people in Crown Dependencies and 272,256 people in British Overseas Territories) are represented in local legislatures in their territories but not in the House of Commons, unless they are resident in the United Kingdom. (Note: Most of the British Overseas Territories and all of the Crown Dependencies have a local representative government, although ultimate authority still resides in Westminster. Legislation has been proposed in past to create parliamentary districts for the British Overseas Territories and the Crown Dependencies, though as of 2020 no bill has been put forward by the British government British nationality law has changed over the years has redefined who has the birthright to live and work in the UK. In 1968 and 1971, as a result of fears about increasing immigration by non-white British citizens, the UK Government introduced immigration restrictions and stripped birthrights on British subjects from some British Overseas Territories. The current principal British nationality law in force, since 1 January 1983, is the British Nationality Act 1981, which established the system of multiple categories of British nationality.)
United States	1965 (Note: While constitutionally given the right to vote by the Fifteenth Amendment in 1870 and 19th Amendment in 1920, the reality of the country was such that most African Americans and some poor whites could not vote until the passage of the Voting Rights Act of 1965. Starting in 1888 Southern states legalized disenfranchisement by enacting Jim Crow laws; they amended their constitutions and passed legislation to impose various voting restrictions, including literacy tests, poll taxes, property-ownership requirements, moral character tests, requirements that applicants interpret a particular document, and grandfather clauses that allowed otherwise-ineligible persons to vote if their grandfathers voted (which excluded many African Americans whose grandfathers had been ineligible). During this period, the Supreme Court generally upheld state efforts to discriminate against racial minorities. In Giles v. Harris (1903), the Court held that irrespective of the Fifteenth Amendment, the judiciary did not have the remedial power to force states to register racial minorities to vote. The Indian Citizenship Act in 1924 gave Native Americans the right to vote and officially recognized them as citizens, nearly two-thirds of whom already had citizenship and the right to vote. In 1943 Chinese immigrants were given the right to citizenship and the right to vote by the Magnuson Act. African Americans and others gained full enfranchisement through passage of the Voting Rights Act of 1965.)	1856 (Note: The 1828 presidential election was the first in which non-property-holding white males could vote in the vast majority of states, but this was not consistent across the country until the last state, North Carolina, abolished property qualification in 1856 resulting in a close approximation to universal white male suffrage (however tax-paying requirements remained in five states in 1860 and survived in two states until the 20th century). The Fourteenth Amendment in 1868 altered the way each state is represented in the House of Representatives. It counted all residents for apportionment including slaves, overriding the Three-fifths Compromise, and reduced a state's apportionment if it wrongfully denied males over the age of 21 the right to vote; however, this was not enforced in practice. Some poor white men remained excluded at least until 1965. For state elections, it was not until the U.S. Supreme Court ruled 6–3 in Harper v. Virginia Board of Elections (1966) that all state poll taxes were unconstitutional as violating the Equal Protection Clause of the Fourteenth Amendment. This removed a burden on the poor.)	1920 (Note: 19th Amendment in 1920 prohibited any United States citizen from being denied the right to vote on the basis of sex, but most African-American women some poor white women remained excluded at least until 1965. For state elections, it was not until the U.S. Supreme Court ruled 6–3 in Harper v. Virginia Board of Elections (1966) that all state poll taxes were unconstitutional as violating the Equal Protection Clause of the Fourteenth Amendment. This removed a burden on the poor.)	1965	In the colonial era, there had been various restrictions on suffrage in what is today the United States. Property restrictions on voting disenfranchised more than half of the white male population in most states.; After the American Revolution, the Constitution did not originally define who was eligible to vote, allowing each state to determine who was eligible. In the early history of the U.S., most states allowed only white male adult property owners to vote (about 6% of the population). Vermont, Pennsylvania, and Kentucky were the three states to have full adult suffrage for white males before 1800. New Jersey allowed women's suffrage for landowners until the early 1800s.; In the 1820 election, there were 108,359 ballots cast. In the 1840 election, 2,412,694 ballots were cast, an increase that far outstripped natural population growth. Poor voters became a huge part of the electorate. By 1856, after the period of Jacksonian democracy, all states had almost universal white adult male suffrage regardless of property ownership. Tax-paying requirements remained in five states, and two into the 20th century.; In 1868, the 14th Amendment altered the way each state is represented in the House of Representatives. It counted all residents for apportionment including former slaves, overriding the three-fifths compromise, and reduced a state's apportionment if it wrongfully denied men aged 21 and above the right to vote. However, this was not enforced in practice. In 1870, the 15th Amendment granted suffrage to all males of any race, skin color, and ethnicity, including former slaves (freedmen), meaning that male African Americans in theory had the right to vote throughout the United States.; Starting in 1888, former Confederate states passed Jim Crow laws and amendments to effectively disfranchise black and poor white voters through poll taxes, literacy tests, grandfather clauses and other restrictions, applied in a discriminatory manner. During this period, the Supreme Court generally upheld state efforts to discriminate against racial minorities; only later in the 20th century were these laws ruled unconstitutional. Black males in the Northern states could vote, but the majority of African Americans lived in the South.; Wyoming was the first territory to enfranchise all women in 1869. From then until 1916, all Western states legalized women suffrage, but few Eastern states followed suit. However, in 1920 the 19th Amendment extended the franchise to women in all states.; In 1924 the Indian Citizenship Act gave suffrage to all Native Americans, nearly two-thirds of whom already had citizenship and the right to vote.; In 1943 Chinese immigrants were given the right to citizenship and the right to vote by the Magnuson Act. It allowed some Chinese immigration for the first time since the Chinese Exclusion Act of 1882, and permitted some Chinese immigrants already residing in the country to become naturalized citizens.; In 1962–1964, the nationwide "one man, one vote" electoral system was lawfully established mainly through the Warren Court's rulings in Baker v. Carr (1962), Reynolds v. Sims (1964), as well as Wesberry v. Sanders (1964).; In 1964–1965, the 24th Amendment, which abolished the use of poll taxes as a requirement for voting in federal elections, was passed. Full enfranchisement was revived in 1965, with the passage of Civil Rights Act of 1964 and Voting Rights Act of 1965, which provided for federal enforcement of rights. For state elections, it was not until the Warren Court ruled 6–3 in Harper v. Virginia Board of Elections (1966) that all state poll taxes were unconstitutional as violating the Equal Protection Clause of the Fourteenth Amendment. This removed a burden on the poor.; In 1971, the 26th Amendment ratified, which granted suffrage for men and women aged 18.; Currently 4 million American citizens living in the Territories of the United States do not have representation in the United States House of Representatives and the United States Senate.
Uruguay	1918		1932		With the 1918 Uruguayan Constitution.
Venezuela			1946		
Zimbabwe	1979		1919	1979	Universal suffrage was introduced in the 1978 Internal Settlement between Ian Smith and Abel Muzorewa. The 1979 Lancaster House constitution agreed to accommodate the nationalists and also affirmed universal suffrage but with a special role for whites. Universal suffrage with no special consideration for race came in 1987. Before 1978, Rhodesia (the name for the region that would become Zimbabwe in 1980) had a merit qualification to vote. This was controversial because it excluded the vast majority of native Africans. Though white women were granted the right to vote in 1919.

== See also ==
- Democracy indices
- Equality before the law
- List of suffragists and suffragettes
- List of women's rights activists
- One man, one vote
- One person, one vote
- Suffrage for Americans with disabilities
- Suffragette
- Timeline of women's suffrage
- Umbrella Movement
  - 2014 Hong Kong protests
