= Women in Spain =

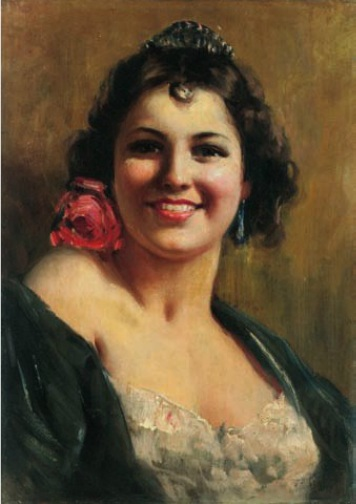

General statistics
- Maternal mortality (per 100,000): 3.3 (2021)
- Women in parliament: 41.2% (2018)
- Women over 25 with secondary education: 63.3% (2010)
- Women in labour force: 58.8% (employment rate OECD definition, 2019)

Gender Inequality Index
- Value: 0.057 (2021)
- Rank: 14th out of 191

Global Gender Gap Index
- Value: 0.788 (2022)
- Rank: 17th out of 146

The status of women in Spain has evolved from the country's earliest history, culture, and social norms. Throughout the late 20th century, Spain has undergone a transition from Francoist Spain (1939–1975), during which women's rights were severely restricted, to a democratic society where gender equality is a fundamental principle. As such, during the past decades the position of women in Spanish society has greatly improved. Women in the broader Spanish population outnumber men by 900,000, totaling an estimated group of 24 million (as of July 2017). Until the establishing of separation of church and state in 1978, the Catholic Church in Spain has played a major role with regard to official views on women's role in society.

== Role in society ==
During the Francoist era, Spanish social values codified a stance of morality that established rigid standards of female sexuality by restricting employment opportunities and prohibiting divorce, contraception, and abortion. The return of democracy saw wide-sweeping changes in the status of women. In the traditional Spanish world, women rarely entered or sustained careers in the national labor market. By the late 1970s, 22% of the country's adult women, still somewhat fewer than in Italy and Ireland, had entered the workforce. By 1984, this figure had increased to 33%, a level not significantly different from Italy or the Netherlands. Women still comprised less than one-third of the total labor force, and in some prominent sectors, such as banking, the figure was closer to one-tenth. A 1977 opinion poll revealed that when asked whether a woman's place was in the home only 22% of young people in Spain agreed, compared with 26% in Britain, 30% in Italy, and 37% in France. The principal barrier to women in the work place was not social pressure, but rather factors such as a high unemployment rate and a lack of part-time jobs. Women were achieving educational parity with men during the late 1970s. In 1983, approximately 46% of Spain's university enrollment was female, the 31st-highest percentage in the world, and comparable to other European countries.

At the height of the Francoist era, Spanish law and legislation discriminated against women who were married. Without her husband's approval (referred to as permiso marital), a wife was prohibited from employment and property ownership. The law also provided for less stringent definitions of such crimes as adultery and desertion for husbands than it did for wives. During Franco's era, although women's role was defined as that of a homemaker who had to largely avoid the public sphere in order to take care of the children, the legal rights over the children belonged to the father; until 1970 the husband could give a family's child to adoption without the consent of his wife. Significant reforms of this system were begun shortly before Franco's death, and they have continued rapidly since then. The permiso marital was abolished in 1975; laws against adultery were cancelled in 1978; and divorce was legalized in 1981. That year, the parts of the civil code that dealt with family finances were also reformed.

Marriages had to be canonical (that is, performed under Roman Catholic law and regulations) if even one of the partners was Catholic, which meant effectively that all marriages in Spain had to be sanctioned by the church. Since the church prohibited divorce, a marriage could be dissolved only through the arduous procedure of annulment, which was available only after a lengthy series of administrative steps and was thus accessible only to the relatively wealthy. These restrictions were probably one of the major reasons for a 1975 survey showing that 71 percent of Spaniards favored legalizing divorce; however, because the government remained in the hands of conservatives until 1982, progress toward a divorce law was slow and full of conflict. In the summer of 1981, the Congress of Deputies (lower chamber of the Cortes Generales, or Spanish Parliament) finally approved a divorce law with the votes of about thirty Union of the Democratic Center (Union de Centro Democratico or UCD) deputies who defied the instructions of party conservatives. As a consequence, Spain had a divorce law that permitted the termination of a marriage in as little as two years following the legal separation of the partners. Still, it would be an exaggeration to say that the new divorce law opened a floodgate for the termination of marriages. Between the time the law went into effect at the beginning of September 1981, and the end of 1984, only slightly more than 69,000 couples had availed themselves of the option of ending their marriages, and the number declined in both 1983 and 1984. There were already more divorced people than this in Spain in 1981 before the law took effect.

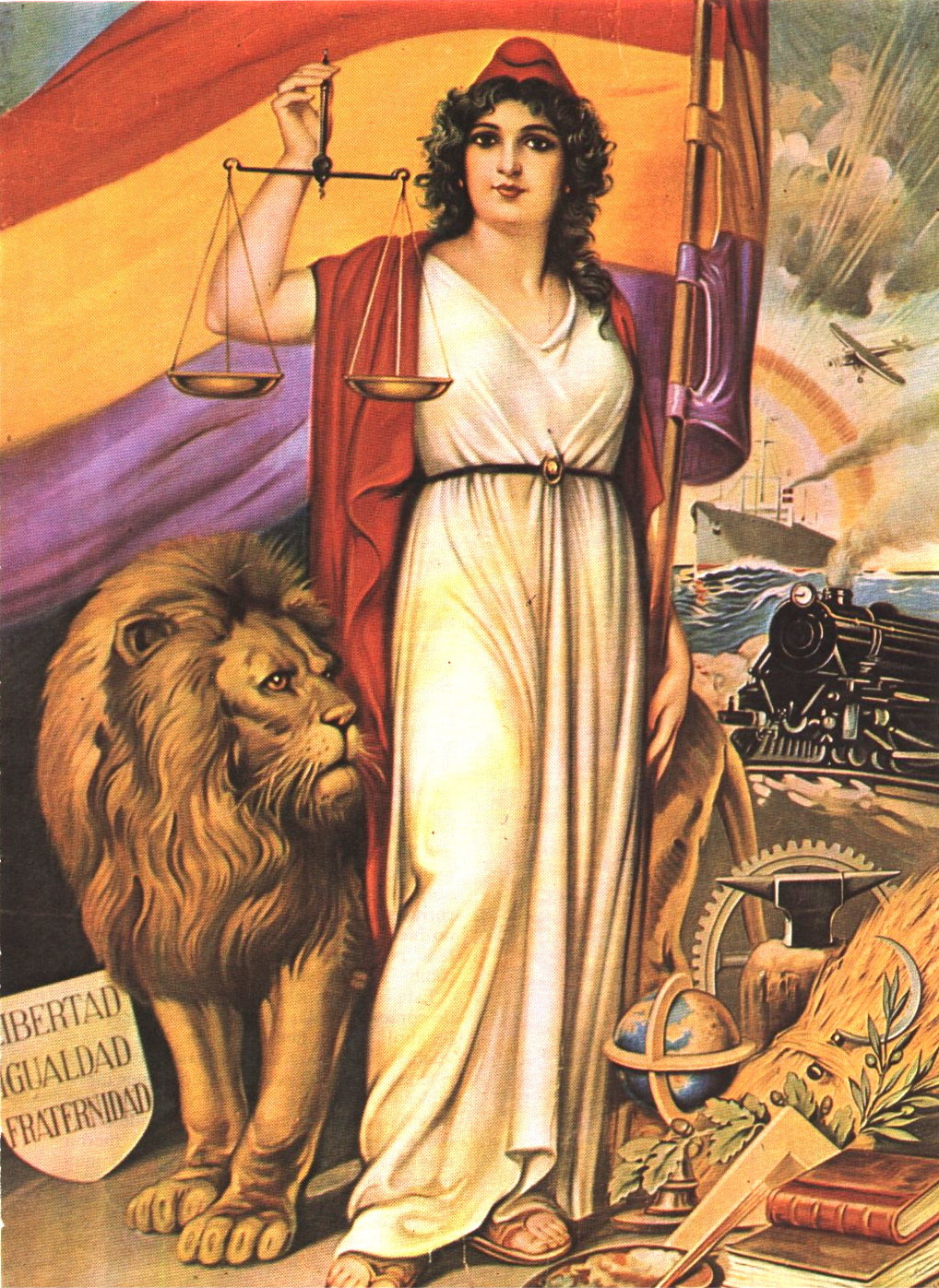
The Allegory of the Spanish Republic, displaying a woman donning republican paraphernalia such as the Phrygian cap.

Despite these important gains, observers expected that the gaining of equal rights for women would be a lengthy struggle, waged on many different fronts. It was not until deciding a 1987 case, for example, that Spain's Supreme Court held that a rape victim need not prove that she had fought to defend herself in order to verify the truth of her allegation. Until that important court case, it was generally accepted that a female rape victim, unlike the victims of other crimes, had to show that she had put up "heroic resistance" in order to prove that she had not enticed the rapist or otherwise encouraged him to attack her.

In recent years, the role of women has largely increased in Spain, especially in politics but also in the labor market and other public areas. New laws have officially eliminated all kinds of discrimination, and are even perceived by some as positive discrimination, but a Conservative part of the society is still ingrained in the macho culture. Even so, Spanish women are quickly approaching their European counterparts, and the younger generations perceive machismo as outdated.

Women in Spain are paid 13% less in public sectors and 19% less in private sectors. Women are portrayed in media as balanced in power with men, but in traditional roles with women as homemakers and mothers and submissive to men.

== Family life ==
As the whole society underwent major transformations, so has family life organization. The liberalization of the political climate has allowed for alternative family formation. In the mid-1990s, cohabitation in Spain was still described as a "marginal" phenomenon, but since the 1990s, cohabitation has increased dramatically; in 2015, 44.4% of births were outside of marriage. The views on traditional family have also changed. In the European Values Study (EVS) of 2008, the percentage of Spanish respondents who agreed with the assertion that "Marriage is an outdated institution" was 31.2%. In 2005, Spain legalized same-sex marriage.

Currently, Spain has one of the lowest birth and fertility rates in the world, up to the point of heavily hampering the population replacement rates. One or two children families are most common, and the age of parents has been increasing. Only immigration can balance such a situation, simultaneously incorporating new values and lifestyles in the Spanish society. As of 2015, the total fertility rate in Spain was 1.49 children/born per woman, which is below the replacement rate.

Spain's parental leave laws, which have changed several times in recent years, have been surrounded by controversy, and Spain's policy on parental leave offering 16 weeks paid leave for each parent, which is non-transferable, as well as additional unpaid leave (excedencia por cuidado de hijo menor de 3 años), has made Spain's approach of equal non-transferable paid leave result in Spain having one of the shortest paid leaves for mothers, but one of the longest paid leaves for fathers, in Europe. Spain's parental leave policy has also led to Spain failing to adhere to the minimum standards of paid parental leave for mothers set by the European Union legislation (namely the Pregnant Workers Directive and the Work–Life Balance Directive) with mothers in Spain having considerably less paid leave than the minimum required by the EU. Spain was fined 6.8 million euros by the ECJ for failing to transpose the EU directive into its national legislation. Following this, Spain has introduced in 2025 additional paid parental leave, also on a non-transferable basis, increasing the paid leave to 19 weeks each parent. Unlike other countries with gender-neutral parental leave, such as the Nordic countries, in Spain all parental leave is non-transferable, therefore parents do not have the right to decide among themselves how much leave can be used by each parent through sharing the leave. Supporters of Spain's fully gender-neutral approach to parental leave argue that this promotes gender equality and equal sharing of responsibilities, while opponents argue that this does not account for biological differences related to childbirth such as breastfeeding, as well as social realities. A 2019 study found that following Spain introduction of full gender equality in its parental leave laws, there was a drop in fertility.

== Violence against women ==
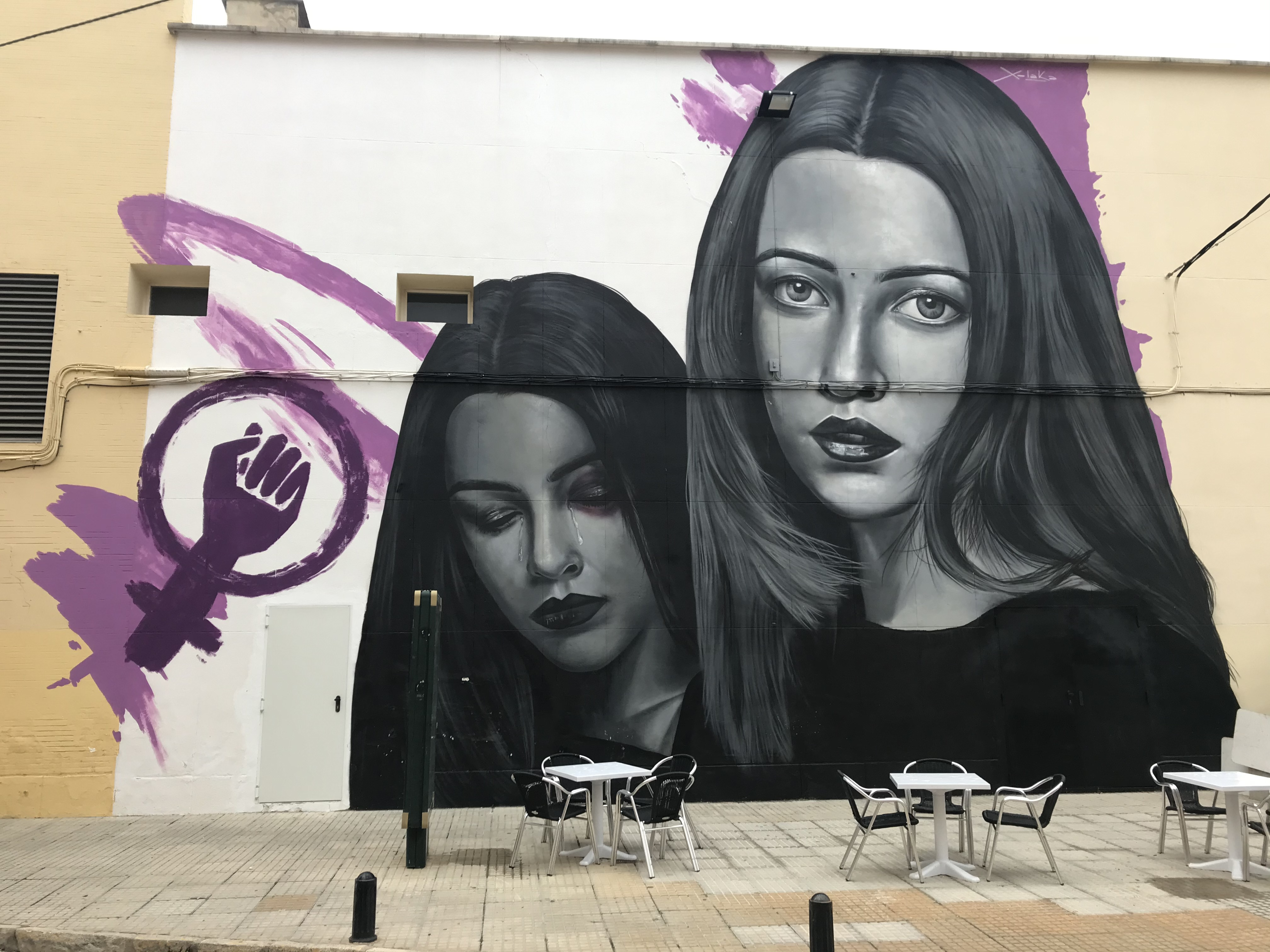
Mural against violence against women in Pego (Valencian Community, Spain)

Violence against women was common and ignored during the Franco era. Before 1963, husbands and fathers who killed their wives and daughters whom they discovered committing adultery or premarital sex incurred only the symbolic punishment of destierro. Adultery was decriminalized in 1978, when the law on adultery in Spain, which discriminated against women, was repealed. In 1985, the law ended the practice in regard to minor girls abusively taken into state custody, as it no longer allowed minors to be placed under the control of the state for their own protection.

After the fall of the Franco regime, Spain has taken many steps to address the issue of violence against women. The Supreme Court ruled in 1992 that sex within marriage must be consensual and that sexuality in marriage must be understood in light of the principle of the freedom to make one's own decisions with respect to sexual activity; in doing so it upheld the conviction of a man who had been found guilty of raping his wife by a lower court. In 2004 the Organic Law 1/2004 of 28 December on Integrated Protection Measures against Gender Violence (Ley Orgánica 1/2004, de 28 de diciembre, de Medidas de Protección Integral contra la Violencia de Género) was enacted.

Many protests rose around Spain, due to the verdict in 2018 regarding an 18-year-old woman who was assaulted at a bull-running festival in Pamplona. She was gang-raped by five men. The men recorded the assault on her phone, which one of the men, a military police officer, stole. The men referred to themselves as the "manada", a word referring to a pack of wolves. The word has been claimed by feminists and women's rights groups as a term to explain one of the aspects of machismo in Hispanic and Latino communities. The men were convicted of assault and were given prison sentences of nine years, rather than being prosecuted of rape, which would have resulted in 23 years in prison. In addition, they had to pay her 50,000 euros (UD$60,600). The military police officer had to pay an extra 900 euros to replace her cellphone. Many people, particularly women's rights activists and feminists believed they should have been convicted of rape.

During Franco's Spain, child sexual abuse was largely ignored, with the country having very lax laws; the age of consent in Spain was only 12. The age of consent was raised to 13 in 1999, and to 16 in 2015 (with a close in age exemption for partners who are "close in age and level of development or maturity"); the marriageable age was also raised from 14 to 16.

== Reproductive rights ==
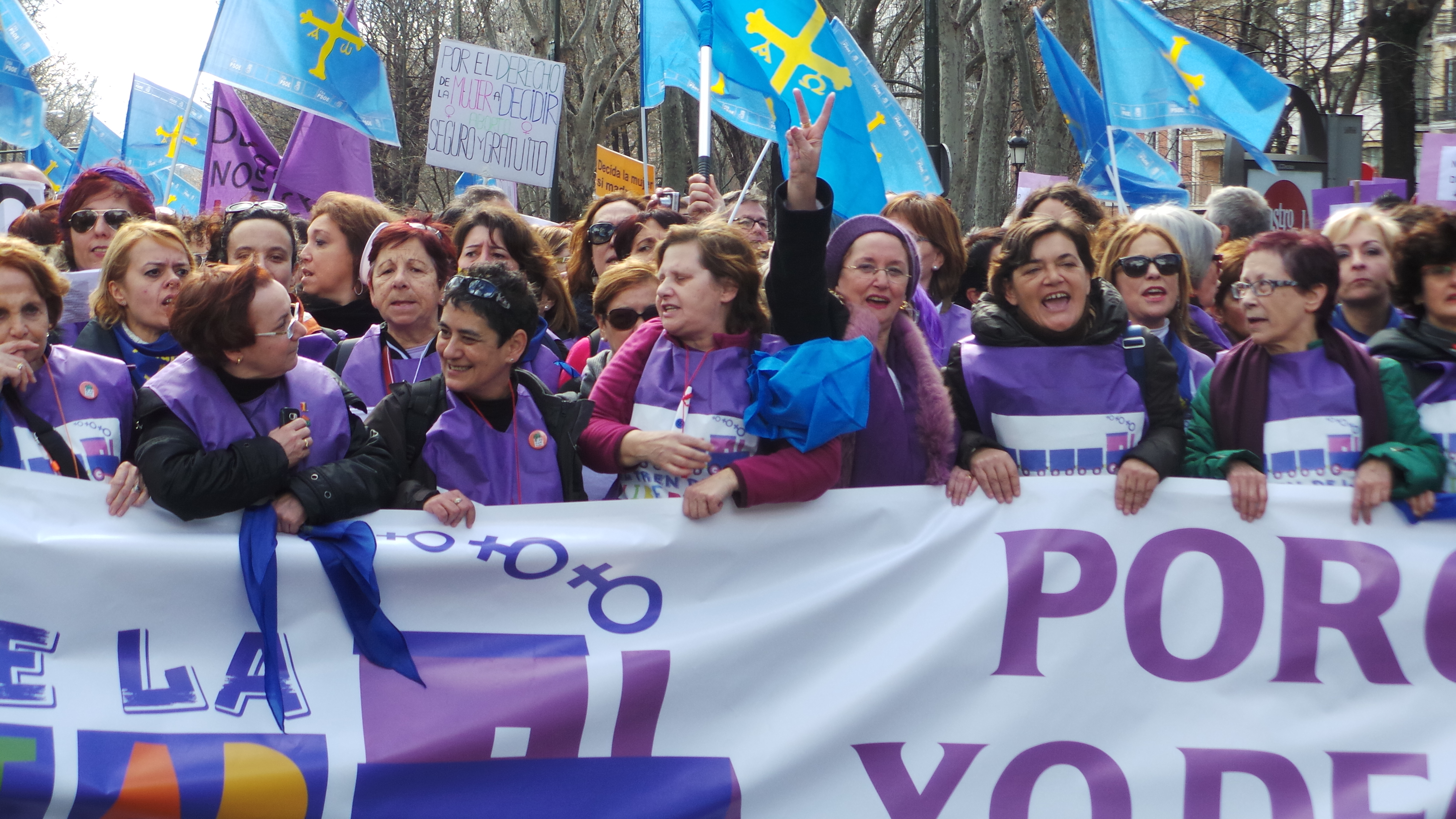
Feminist pro-choice manifestations in Madrid in 2014

In Spain, contraception was banned in January 1941. The natalist law for "the protection of natality, against abortion and contraceptionist propaganda" remained valid until 1978, while methods such as IUD and sterilization remained illegal until 1980. However, the pill was available on prescription for medical reasons from 1964. During the Franco era, in practice, middle-class urban women could often access modern contraceptive methods.

Abortion in Spain is legal upon request up to 14 weeks of pregnancy, and at later stages for serious risk to the health of the woman or fetal defects. Abortion legislation in Spain has a fluctuating history. During the 1930s, abortion law was liberalized in the area controlled by the Republicans, but this was short-lived, as the Franco regime with support of the Catholic Church, outlawed abortion again. The laws were relaxed in 1985, and were further liberalized in 2010. Abortion remains a controversial political issue in Spain, but regular moves to restrict it have lacked majority support. In recent years, abortion rates have been falling, as better access to emergency contraception has been introduced (see emergency contraception in Spain).

== International Women's Day ==
On International Women's Day in 2018, there were over 250 demonstrations all over Spain. Some feminist groups asked women to spend no money and do no chores for the day as a domestic strike. At midnight, hundreds of women gathered in Puerta del Sol in Madrid, where they banged pots and pans and shouted women's rights slogans.

The protests were backed by ten unions, who were on strike for 24 hours. Many other unions called for two hour work stoppages. Madrid's metro system was severely disrupted. The strike was covered by news anchors, but the most famous female anchors were away from work.

Left-leaning female lawmakers left the Parliament of Valencia with signs on their chairs that read "I'm stopping".

== See also ==
- Allegory of Hispania
- Culture of Spain
- Women in Europe
- Women in Vatican City
