= Guardianship in Francoist Spain and the democratic transition =

Guardianship in Francoist Spain (1939 – 1975) and the democratic transition (1975 – 1985) was a system which provided husbands and fathers with tremendous legal control over women. Male members of the family were able to transfer legal control of their daughters over to the state. One of the developments after the Civil War was the restoration of the Civil Code of 1889 by the Franco regime. This made women dependents of their husbands and fathers with men controlling not only the custody of their children, but their bank accounts, contracts, nationality and residency. Women did not reach the age of majority until 21, 25 if they were unmarried or not in a convent. Before 1963, husbands and fathers who killed their wives and daughters whom they discovered committing adultery or having sex outside marriage incurred only the symbolic punishment of destierro. Before the 1970s, women were banned from many professions. Until 1970, the husband could give a family's child to adoption without the consent of his wife.

Although minor legal reforms were made in the 1950s and 1960s, largely as a result of economic pressures, and more important reforms were enacted in the 1970s, discriminatory laws remained in force until the 1980s. Reforms around eliminating guardianship accelerated in the 1970s, before the death of Franco. They included the relinquishment of controls over nationality, children's custody and inheritance, while men no longer automatically became the default head of household. In 1975, the permiso marital was abolished, improving the legal status of married women. Reforms accelerated in the democratic transition period. The 1978 Spanish constitution gave men and women equality under the law, effectively ending the Franco regime's system of guardianship for single women. A new family law was enacted in 1981, giving married women full civil rights, and legalizing divorce. In 1985, the law ended the practice in regard to minor girls abusively taken into state custody, as it no longer allowed minors to be placed under the control of the state for their own protection.

== Francoist period (1939–1975) ==
=== 1930s Francoist Spain ===
The Civil Code of 1889 was restored by the Franco regime. This code saw the re-introduction of guardianship and subordination of women into civil law. It also saw the age of majority changed to 23, or 25 if they had not left their parents' home to marry or join a convent. Fuero del Trabajo of 1938 was the law which prevented married women from working in workshops or factories. The goal was to make women free to tend to their husband's needs inside their household.

The rights of a husband over his wife were so strict that they amounted to a kind of slavery. The laws treated women as if they were permanent minors, in the custody of their husbands. It treated them as if they were insane or demented. Under the law, women were required to have the same nationality and residency as their husbands. Women had to submit to the authority of their husbands. Women did not have legal custody of their children as full custody belonged only to husbands. The only exception was if a woman was widowed, and remarrying would mean custody would be transferred to her new husband. Women could not sign contracts without the consent of their husbands. They could not open a bank account without their husband's consent. They had to leave work once they married. Women's marital assets were considered paraphernalia, which they could not manage or sell without their husband's consent. Women could not accept inheritances.

=== 1940s ===
Daughters had limited options to leave their father's households in the 1940s. They could only leave if one of their parents died and then remarried. Even then girls needed permission from a judge, and a place to live in the house of another relative. The Labor Regulation Act of 1942 said women had to sign a voluntary dismissal form within a month of being married that resulted in them losing their job. After that, newly married women had to wait two years before they could re-enter the workforce and only then, if they had permission from their husband. A 1943 law changed the age of majority for single women to 21. Despite turning 21, women could not leave the home at that age unless their fathers gave permission; they would have to wait until they were 25. The only exception was if a woman married, or entered a convent. Under the Labor Contracts Act of 1944 women needed permission from their husband before they were able to sign an employment contract. In Barcelona during the 1940s, women had to be accompanied by men such as fathers, brothers or husbands if they wanted to be out on the street at night; they could not go out unaccompanied. This was a national policy that said women could not go out alone, and needed to be accompanied by a male family member.

The 1944 Penal Code allowed for blood revenge for adultery, but only in cases where a husband caught his wife in the sexual act of committing adultery, not when a wife caught her husband. The law also stated under Article 428 that parents could kill their daughter if she was 22 years old or younger, and they caught her having sex with a man. Protests had taken place in the 1920s by women opposed to earlier versions of the law. Husbands and parents were still punished under the law for these killings, but the consequences were small and mostly included only a man being forced to leave his home and live at least 25 kilometers away for a few years. There was no punishment if the husband only seriously injured his wife. The code specified, "The husband who, if his wife is caught in adultery and he kills the woman or the adulterer on the spot or causes them one of the serious injuries, will be punished with banishment. If he causes them second-class injuries, he will be free of punishment. These rules are applicable to parents in the same circumstances, with respect to their daughters under twenty-three years of age and their corruptors, as long as they have been living in their father's house."

Teenage girls could become wards of the state through Patronato de Protección a la Mujer. Starting in 1941 and until 1985, girls were taken to centers run by nuns as part of the state's objective of rehabilitating the "fallen". Some of these girls were dropped off by parents who no longer wanted to care of them, as in the case of Raquel Castillo. Some girls were put into state custody because they were denounced by family members. Marian Torralbo was denounced by her brother, a member of Acción Católica, for partying. All were incapacitated without a trial. Women could not leave in many cases until they were 25-years-old, the age when they were legally adult women.

Girls put into these reformatories were subject to virginity tests conducted by nuns. This was done on a daily basis, with girls forced to sit on a hospital bed where a doctor would ask them if they were a virgin. After they said yes, the doctor would imply they were liars and then put a stick up a girl's vagina to check without her consent. Many girls became hysterical during this process.

Prostitutes were held at facilities run by nuns through Patronato de Protección a la Mujer from 1941 to 1985. They were always a minority, representing between 7 and 10% of the population. They would be put into cells next to girls abandoned by their families, spending only a few nights. According to Carlos Álvarez, researcher at the University of the Basque Country, "Their confinement fulfilled two objectives: on the one hand to separate them from the rest of society so that they did not influence it, and on the other hand to be 'rehabilitated', along the path of redemption."

=== 1950s ===
The economic situation in the 1950s led to a revisiting of the Fuero del Trabajo. Spain was expanding its industrial activities and needed a workforce to support this. One of the easiest and cheapest ways to do that was to increase the number of women in the workforce. Economic needs of Spain were viewed as more important than ideological goals. Meaningful legal reforms for women were not covered under the Civil Code until the late 1950s and early 1960s. These changes were a result of pressure by women to bring the law more in line with cultural shifts in attitudes. One such amendment followed a newspaper article by Mercedes Formica about a man who stabbed his wife to death. The change in the 1889 Civil Code gave greater protections to married women. Other changes in law saw the home being redefined less as a husband's domain but rather a family domain. Married women were entitled to half a couple's common property, and husbands were required to obtain permission from their wives before selling the woman's half. When a widowed woman with children remarried, she was now allowed to keep custody of her children in the new marriage.

Laws on guardianship in Spain were not reformed until 24 April 1958. One reform meant that women could retain custody of their children if they were widowed and remarried, but only if the deceased husband specified this in his will. Another reform of the 1958 law meant that for the first time a husband could not sell or alienate marital property without his wife's consent. These, and changes around the custody of children, came about as a result of a concordat with the Vatican. Mercedes Formica, a member of Falange, was one of the major supporters of the 1958 Civil Code reforms reducing the restrictions placed on married Spanish women. Formica was active in developing a feminist consciousness in Madrid in this period.

Article 57 continued to be problematic in 1958, as it specified husbands must protect their wives. It established authority of men over women, and was used by men to justify gender violence that caused grievous harm to their wives. It established marriage as a dictatorship.

=== 1960s ===
Up until the mid-1960s, Franco's legal system gave husbands near total control over their wives. This did not change until women started playing a more central role in the Spanish economy. The 1961 Law on Political Rights was supported by Sección Feminina. This amendment to the law gave women in the workforce additional rights, recognizing the importance of their work. The law saw single women being entitled to a salary similar to that of her male peers working in the same job. Pilar Primo de Rivera commented, "The law rather than being feminist is, on the contrary, supportive of what men can give to women as the emptier glass. Why else would we want the man's salary to be sufficiently remunerative so that women, especially married woman, would not have to work out of necessity! I assure you that if family life was sufficiently endowed, 90% of women would not work. For us, it is much more convenient and more desirable to have all the problems solved. But there are many families not just in Spain but around the world that cannot dispense with working women, precisely because it ensures there is enough for their children's care and education, the primary goal of marriage." The law had one problem though in that married women still required permission from their husbands to accept a job.

The blood revenge law was rescinded in 1963, with husbands and parents no longer having the right to kill wives or daughters caught engaging in illicit sex acts. Many women and some men were in prison for adultery-related offenses. They were rarely talked about. Starting in 1975, before the death of Franco, women had started to mobilize by taking to the streets to demand the decriminalization of adultery.

Single pregnant teenage girls could be particularly vulnerable during this period, with the state assuming guardianship of them and their children at the Peña Grande maternity prison, officially known as Nuestra Señora de La Almudena, until the girls were 25. In some cases, the state would line these pregnant women in a row, bring in men who had paid a fee and allow them to choose among the woman for one to marry or work in his home; the women would never know this beforehand. The men would sometimes return the women they had selected, indicating they were not happy with their choice and then pick out a new woman. It was primarily from the Peña Grande maternity prison that the stolen babies were taken, with women continuing to be imprisoned there until 1984. The conditions at the state facility were so bad that girls would commit suicide by jumping off the top stairwell. María Ángeles Martínez was one woman kept at the Peña Grande facility while pregnant. She remembered her experience, commenting: "I entered as a 19-year-old, in August of 1975. I was an orphan and I had just gotten pregnant, so my sister-in-law, who wanted to get rid of me, told me 'get dressed we're going', and without my knowing where we were going, she brought me here." She described the nuns, "They told me what I was going to do with a daughter, how I was going to feed her, if they had thrown me out of the house, if I was a wretch, and she was going to be one too." She described the process of giving birth, "I was in the dilatation room, and with half a head already out and they told me that I had to walk alone to the operating room and get on the gurney. I went with all the care, but she was born with a deformed skull. When they saw it, they stopped insisting I give her to them. I think that's why I did not lose my daughter."

=== 1970–1975 ===
A reform in 1970 meant that women could prevent their husbands putting their children up for adoption without their consent. Law 31/1972 changed the law in respect to articles 320 and 321. It reduced the age of majority to 21 in all cases for women, and allowed women to act as an adult in civil life. This meant both men and women reached majority when they were 21. The law changed in 1972 to give women more freedom from their fathers. It allowed women 22 years old and older to leave the familial home without the consent of their parents.

The Association of Women Lawyers was created in Madrid in 1971. They eventually played an important role in the Codification Commission for the reform of Family Law. The last major legal reform for women occurred in May 1975, when men were stripped of their automatic head of household status, women no longer being required by law to obey them or being forced to take their husbands' nationality. The amendment in Article 62 stated, "Marriage does not restrict the capacity of one of the spouses to act." Article 63 removed the requirement that a wife obey her husband, and was amended to specify that both spouses had a mutual obligation to respect and protect each other. These changes meant women could accept inheritances, appear in court, and accept a job without the approval of their husbands. The changes also impacted who controlled matrimonial property. The law was also changed so that husbands were no longer married women's legal representatives by default.

== Democratic transition period (1975–1985) ==
=== 1975–1980 ===
Franco died in November 1975. His death brought about a slow process of reform over the next decade. One of the major revolutions of the 1978 Spanish constitution was that it gave men and women equality under the law. Cristina Almeida explained its importance stating, "What I knew and we all knew was that there were such obstacles that no matter how much the Constitution said that equality was decreed, it was not so easy to get it." The advances for women in the constitution were largely a result of feminist women who continually took to the streets to demand equal rights. As women took no direct part in writing the new Spanish constitution, gender discrimination continued to exist within Spanish law. In 1978, the law on adultery in Spain, which discriminated against women, was repealed.

Despite many of the changes brought about during the transition, there was no way of establishing the number of women who were killed by their partners or husbands before the 1990s. The abuse and murder of women in Spain by their partners was a form of sexist terrorism and claimed more victims than ETA.

=== 1980s ===
It was only in the 1980s that gender equality in civil law was established in Spain. While the permiso marital was abolished in 1975, and adultery was decriminalized in 1978, it was only through Law 11/1981 that men and women became equal in marriage, removing the remaining discriminatory provisions, and also legalizing divorce. The new regulations were in line with United Nations guidelines. Children, on turning 18, now had a legal option to choose whether their father's or mother's surname came first. Law 30/1981 of 7 July also set a civil divorce process. If a family did not exercise an option to change the order of the names in their surname, the law defaulted to the father's surname as the first.

The law changed in 1985 in regard to minor girls abusively taken into state custody, as it no longer allowed minors to be placed under the control of the state for their own protection. Following this, all remaining efforts for reform were terminated.
