= Suffrage for Americans with disabilities =

Aspect of disabled people's rights in the United States

Americans with disabilities face extra challenges when exercising their suffrage. According to Abilities United, over 16% of Americans are considered to have either a physical, developmental, or learning disability. The barriers that 33.7 million persons with disabilities face within the American electoral process include access to polling information, physical access to polls, current and future laws that deal with the topic, and the moral implications regarding the varying levels of both physical and cognitive disabilities and the act of voting.

== Political engagement ==
Multiple sources report that persons with disabilities comprise one of the most disenfranchised groups within American society. As a result, Americans with both physical and cognitive disabilities are amongst the least politically engaged members of the electorate. For example, during the 2012 election cycle, 11% fewer residents with disabilities turned out to vote than nondisabled Americans. According to a 2013 report written by Rutgers University professor Lisa Schur, as many as three million more citizens with disabilities would have turned out to vote had they voted at the same rate as non-disabled citizens.

== Accessibility to polls ==
Strict photo ID (9 states) Photo ID (non-strict) (8 states) Strict non-photo ID required (3 states) Non-photo ID required (non-strict) (13 states) No ID required to vote at ballot box (17 states)

Voter identification laws greatly impact accessibility to polls for those with disabilities. As the largest population of citizens without drivers licenses, persons with both physical and cognitive disabilities face the obstacle of strict identification laws at polling places within some states. Within stricter states (see photo below), many disabled persons who do not have physical identification cards are required to submit absentee ballots. The National Conference of State Legislatures (NCSL) provides a web page with ID requirements for voting in each state, and those with the strictest requirements often present the largest challenges to disabled Americans.

Many polling places are considered to be nearly entirely inaccessible to persons with disabilities. Within the past several years, the Federal Election Commission has reported that more than 20,000 polling places across the nation are not fully accessible for disabled individuals. In 1999, the New York Attorney General stated that fewer than 10% of upstate polling facilities were fully compliant with state and federal laws. A leading theory that attempts to explain the lack of political engagement within disabled communities deals primarily with physical access to polling places. The failure to comply with state and federal laws can manifest itself in many ways, but typically results in a lack of functional wheelchair ramps, sparse placement of accessible entrance signs, and generally inaccessible physical voting booths. As a result, resources and physical aides such as Help America Vote Act-mandated voting machines are utilized for federal elections and aim to assist persons with disabilities.

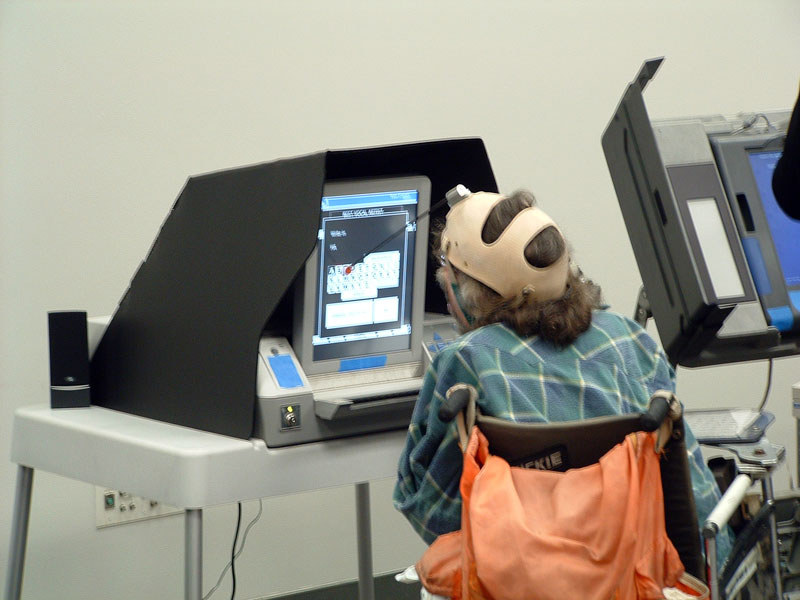
This voter with a manual dexterity disability is making choices on a touchscreen with a head dauber. This is an example of adaptive technology in use.

One of the most popularly utilized methods of combatting these problems in recent years has exhibited itself in the utilization of electronic voting machines. Because "punch card" and "lever" voting machines are often inaccessible to many parts of the disabled community, adaptive technology has been applied to many traditional devices, and many different kinds of accessible machines have been developed. Legislation like the Help America Vote Act has required that at least one accessible machine be available at each polling place.

== Contemporary laws protecting suffrage for people with disabilities ==
Both state and federal legislatures have enacted thousands of pages of legislation regarding the rights of Americans with disabilities. Several major "landmark" pieces of legislation have served as models.

=== Voting Accessibility for the Elderly and Handicapped Act ===
Passed into law in 1984, the Voting Accessibility for the Elderly and Handicapped Act requires polling places to ensure accessibility for all disabled persons during federal elections.

Americans with Disabilities Act of 1990
- Other short titles: ADA
- Long title: An act to establish a clear and comprehensive prohibition of discrimination on the basis of disability
- Acronyms (colloquial): ADA
- Enacted by: the 101st United States Congress
- Effective: July 26, 1990

=== Americans with Disabilities Act ===
The Americans with Disabilities Act of 1990 (or ADA) is widely considered to be the first major attempt to define the rights of disabled Americans at a federal level. Signed into law by President George H. W. Bush, the act prohibits discrimination based on disability. The U.S DOJ Civil Rights Division phrases the right to access to the polls, as well as the right to register to vote, in these terms: "(the ADA) safeguards the voting rights of a person with a disability."

Though the ADA is wide-ranging in scope, it has had many lasting effects on the suffrage of disabled Americans. Some of the most prominent changes that resulted from the legislation included calls for accessibility within polling stations. This effort to increase accessibility has led to the establishment of mandatory accessible parking, passenger drop off areas, and building entrances at polling places. However, according to some advocates, the Act itself has not been the "silver bullet" many hoped it would be, and leaves many disabled persons open to ongoing persecution.

Remarks on the signing of the Americans with Disabilities Act (July 26, 1990)
George H. W. Bush's July 26, 1990, remarks on the signing of the Americans with Disabilities Act

=== Help America Vote Act ===
Passed into law in 2002, the Help America Vote Act (HAVA) creates "mandatory minimum standards for states to follow in several key areas of election administration." Passing both federal legislatures with bipartisan support, the Act authorized the Secretary of Health and Human Services to make polling places accessible to persons with disabilities. The legislation has a particularly sharp focus on individuals affected by visual impairments, and requires each polling station to have to at least one disability-accessible voting machine per federal election. The Act has three main goals: replace punch-card and lever based voting systems, establish the Election Assistance Commission in order to assist with the administration of federal elections, and establish minimum federal election standards

Critics of the Act claim that its reach should be expanded to more than solely federal elections. While states receive funding for disability-accessible touchscreen electronic voting machines under HAVA, municipalities such as cities and towns do not directly receive funding. As a result, critics claim that the machines are not evenly distributed.

=== National Voter Registration Act ===
The National Voter Registration Act of 1993 attempted to increase the historically low registration rates of minorities and persons with disabilities by requiring both federal and state agencies to assist in voter registration procedures.

=== Civil Rights of Institutionalized Persons Act ===
Passed into law in 1980, the Civil Rights of Institutionalized Persons Act protects the rights of persons in jails, publicly operated nursing homes, and institutions for people with psychiatric or developmental disabilities.

=== Voting Rights Act ===
Originally passed into law to combat racial discrimination at polling places, the Voting Rights Act of 1965 has recently been used to support advances of disabled suffrage. Section 208 of the Act allows citizens affected by "blindness, disability, or the inability to read or write" to assign an individual to help cast votes within a ballot box. Restrictions on the assignment of said individual include the voter's employer or agent of their union.

== Contemporary laws restricting suffrage for people with disabilities ==
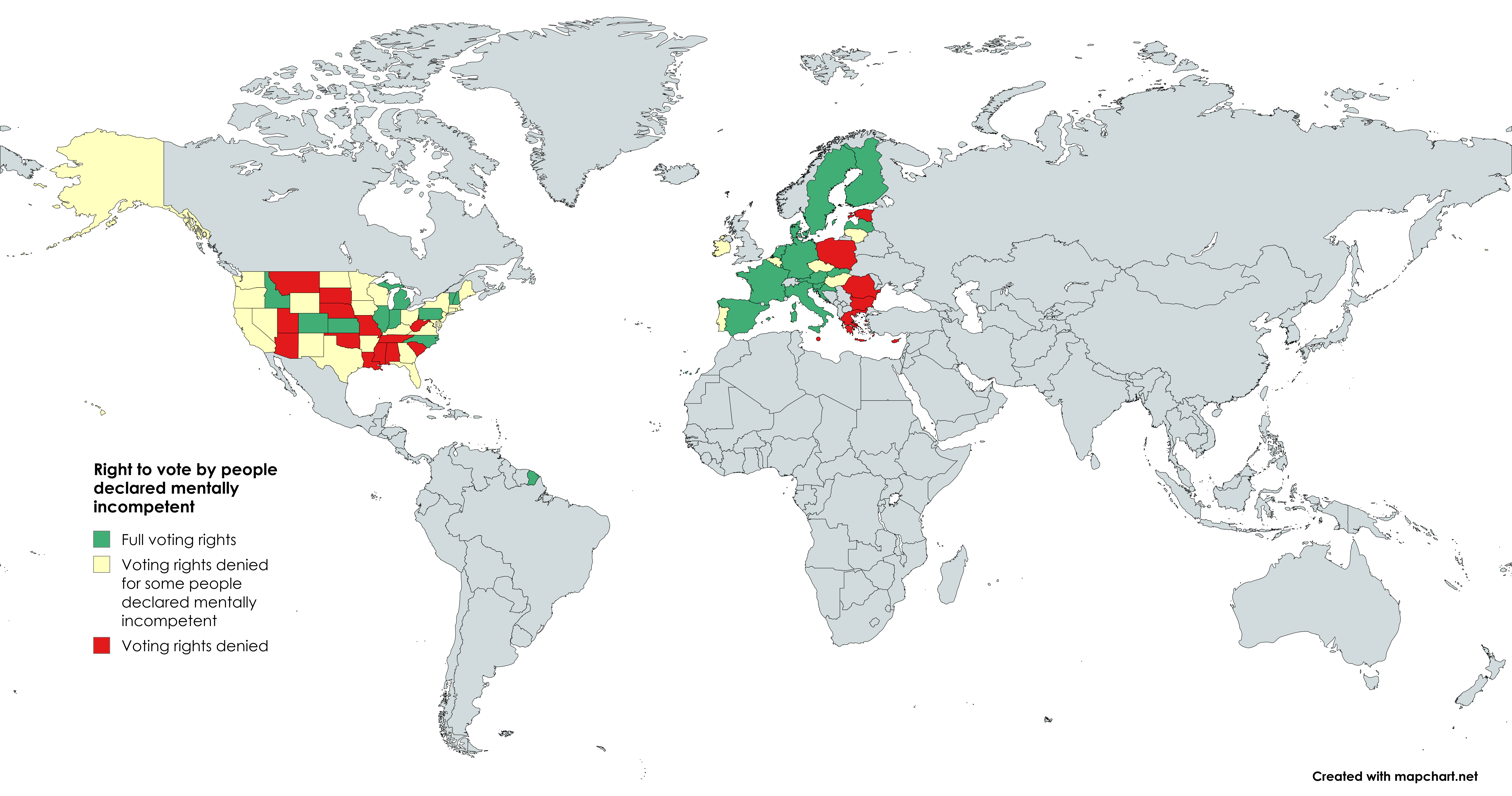
Right to vote by people declared mentally incompetent

In some states, people who are deemed mentally incompetent are not allowed to vote. In the conservatorship process, people can lose their right to vote.

== See also ==
- Voting rights in the United States
- Disability rights movement
