= Adultery in Francoist Spain and the democratic transition =

Adultery in Francoist Spain and the democratic transition was a criminal offense which was defined as sexual intercourse between a married woman and a man other than her husband, and could lead to prison terms of between six months and six years. By contrast, the related crime for male infidelity was not treated the same: it was called amancebamiento and was defined as a married man keeping a mistress in the conjugal home, or keeping a mistress in a notorious manner outside the conjugal home. Adultery (adulterio) was often prosecuted, but not amancebamiento, with male infidelity being "a state of mind in Spain".

In the period between 1944 and 1963, blood revenge was allowed for husbands who caught their wives in bed with other men. This allowed the husbands to injure or kill them with no real penal or civil punishment, with only the symbolic punishment of destierro. Many women were imprisoned in the Francoist period for adultery, but the topic was little discussed in wider society.

Before the death of Francisco Franco in 1975, women had already started to mobilize to see the adultery law overturned. This movement accelerated during the post-Franco transition to democracy (1975-1982). Adultery court cases, like the mid-1976 cases of Inmaculada Benito and María Ángeles Muñoz, mobilized feminists and their allies to take to the streets in a strengthened call to overturn the law. This finally happened on 26 May 1978 when adultery was eliminated as a criminal offense in Spain's penal code, with the repeal of Articles 449 and 452.

== History ==
=== Francoist period (1939 - 1975) ===
Women in Spain during the Franco regime had very few legal rights. For example, until 1975, without her husband's consent (referred to as permiso marital), a wife was prohibited from employment, traveling away from home, and property ownership. In addition, male sexuality and female sexuality were treated differently by law and society, influenced by the traditional gender roles of machismo and marianismo. Although women were expected to guard their "chastity", there was very little protection from child sexual abuse, with the country having very lax laws on child protection: the age of consent in Spain was only 12 (The age of consent was raised to 13 in 1999, and to 16 in 2015, with a close in age exemption for partners who are "close in age and level of development or maturity"; the marriageable age was also raised from 14 to 16.)

The Penal Code of 1870 was reintroduced in 1944, making adultery a criminal offense. Women could be sent to prison for committing adultery. Women could also lose custody of their children. Article 449 of the Penal Code stated, "Adultery will be punished with the penalty of minor prison terms. The married woman who lies with a man who is not her husband commits adultery, as does the one who lies with her, knowing that she is married, even if the marriage is declared null and void." It continued: "No penalty shall be imposed for the crime of adultery except by virtue of the grievance of the aggrieved husband". And it was still completed with one more article, "The husband may at any time remit the sentence imposed on his consort." A woman could not report her husband to the authorities for committing acts of infidelity, unless he kept a mistress inside the conjugal house or flagrantly outside it, and this crime was almost never prosecuted.

The regime's adultery laws were based on the Siete Partidas, established by Alfonso X, and designed to punish women for having sex outside of marriage. These laws would remain on the books until 1978.

The 1944 Penal Code allowed for blood revenge to be punished with the symbolic sentence of destierro, but only in cases where a husband caught his wife in the sexual act of committing adultery, not when a wife caught her husband. The law also stated fathers could kill their daughters if she was 22 years old or younger, and they caught her having sex with a man with the same symbolic punishment of exile from their home at a distance greater than 25 kilometers for a few years and there was no punishment if the husband/father only gave injuries not classed as "grave" to his wife/daughter. The code said, "The husband who, if his wife is caught in adultery, will kill the woman or the adulterer on the spot or cause them one of the serious injuries, will be punished with banishment. If he causes them second-class injuries, he will be free of punishment. These rules are applicable to fathers in the same circumstances, with respect to their daughters under twenty-three years of age and their corruptors, as long as they lived in their father's house. Protests had taken place in the 1920s by women opposed to earlier versions of the law, found in Article 438."

The blood revenge law was rescinded in 1963, with husbands and fathers no longer having the right to kill wives or daughters caught engaging in illicit sex acts. Lots of women and some men were in prison for offenses relating to adultery. They were rarely talked about. Starting in 1975, before the death of Franco, women had started to mobilize by taking to the streets to demand the decriminalization of adultery.

Caserón de la Goleta, the prison for women in Málaga, held thousands of women over its history. Women found themselves there for a wide variety of offenses including adultery, divorce or lesbian relationships. Divorce was illegal in Spain during Franco era and was legalized in 1981.

=== Democratic transition period (1975 - 1982) ===
In the immediate post-Franco era, feminists in Spain were united in their goal to eliminate the law that made adultery a criminal offense. Their efforts were supported by many anonymous women and some men. They found support in their goals from progressive political parties.

Inmaculada Benito and María Ángeles Muñoz were two of the last women in Spain to be tried for adultery, only escaping prison when the adultery law was repealed in 1978. Their cases were brought in mid-1976. At the time, Benito was a 21-year-old medical student from Zaragoza while Muñoz was a 30-year-old domestic worker living in Barcelona. Both had dependent children and both had separated from their husbands. In December 1976, two women were accused of adultery in Lugo and Pontevedra. The woman from Lugo was acquitted but the woman in Pontevedra was ordered to serve a six-month prison sentence and pay a fine of 100 pesetas. Their cases started after those of Benito and Muñoz.

Inmaculada Benito asked Gloria Labarta to represent her in her adultery case. Labarta explained Benito's request as, "She had already gone to several lawyers and everyone told her that she would be punished. I, on the other hand, told her that first, her husband would have to prove adultery, that just because she went on a boat with a man did not mean she had slept with him." Benito had been separated from her spouse, painter Carmelo Caneiro, almost since she had married him at the age of 18. Benito thought she had a good relationship with Caneiro. After finding a new partner, she left her son with him and went to seek work in the Canary Islands. According to Labarta, "The problem arose because the husband's family did not let the maternal grandparents see the infant. [Benito] returned and, then, they did not want to return the baby." It amounted to a custody dispute that quickly escalated to an adultery accusation as there was no other legal recourse for custody disagreements. The prosecutor requested Benito be imprisoned for six years, pay a fine of 5 million pesetas and lose custody of her children.

Labarta's approach to the case was to question the law itself. In her own words she explains, "We did it through an association to which I also belonged, the Democratic Association of Aragonese Women, with an awareness campaign explaining that this accusation was outrageous." She also started a letter writing campaign, including contacting the Minister of Justice and the President of the Government Carlos Arias Navarro. She made the case a political cause, getting women's groups from across the country to assist Benito's cause. Labarta said, "The Catalans and the Madrilenians, who were much more organized, came with buses. While we were at the trial, they were demonstrating outside with placards and shouting 'I am also an adulteress.' (Spanish: Yo también soy adúltera). There was a popular outcry against that legislation." The judge ruled the case unproven as the husband was not able to certify that the man's penis had penetrated his wife's vagina." This was an important legal distinction as it meant there was no possibility that a child could be made outside of marriage. Labarta said of the not-proven accusation, "I am convinced that if it had not been for popular support, they would have taken adultery as proven. In other sentences of his, a guilty verdict was given to woman who had spent two hours in a house with a man."

Muñoz was married to a gay man with whom she had a daughter. Living in Badalona, she was separated from her husband who had left her to live with another man Mallorca shortly after the birth of their daughter. Muñoz later fell in love again, moved in with her new partner, and the couple had a child together. According to her lawyer Enric Leira, "When her husband later found out, he filed a lawsuit to recover custody of the daughter and, in addition, filed another complaint for adultery." The judge assigned to Muñoz's case, Andrés de Castro, was an avowed fascist who had imprisoned the 113 members of the Assemblea de Catalunya arrested on 28 October 1973. De Castro's first act was to award custody of Muñoz's daughter to her husband. Following this decision, Leira said, "Then the big mess was put together. The demonstrations began in the streets and I received a surprising visit. The police commissioner of Santa Coloma came to see me at my office. I was stunned. He explained that they were looking for María Ángeles, but he made it clear that they did not have much interest in finding her. It was a totally delirious, grotesque situation. [...] Everyone wanted to help her. The consensus was total, apart from four nostalgic of national-Catholicism. The most mobilized were the feminists. They contacted me to organize a campaign to publicize the case. The demonstrations, basically of women, were tremendous." There was a march in Barcelona in November 1976 where 5,000 protested the law that made adultery illegal. The protest was in response to the case of Ángeles Muñoz. Her lawyer went on to say, "You could not talk to Judge De Castro, he was not capable of any reason, with an inflexibility towards the law." With few available options, Leira got in touch with the husband's lawyers. She said of this, "Legal arguments were few because the Francoist legislation did not leave much room. But thanks to some details and also to social pressure, we managed to reach a pact with the father." The husband withdrew his adultery complaint and signed an agreement that where both sides said they believed it in the best interest of the child for her to live with her mother.

During the early and mid-1970s, the Supreme Court received a large number of appeals from women over their adultery convictions. A man with the initials MDL was convicted on 15 October 1976, the woman concerned being successfully granted her appeal a year and a half later. The Supreme Court commented, "Nothing is said in the judgment appealed regarding the fact that the defendant had knowledge of the woman's marital status." Another woman who had a relationship was less fortunate, with the Supreme Court dismissing her appeal despite her claim that she had received permission from her husband. The court said in rejecting the appeal, "There was no consent, because although the husband knew about the behavior of his wife, he could not exercise the action while the guilty party lived abroad." A man and a woman appealed their 14 September 1973 adultery conviction on the grounds of marital separation on the part of the woman. The Supreme Court rejected this, stating, "As long as the marriage is not annulled or the current legality is modified, the marriage bond subsists and its ethical and fidelity duties remain."

On 26 May 1978, adultery was eliminated as a criminal offense in Spain's penal code. This took place as a result of the repeal of Articles 449 and 452. The Justice Committee of the Congress of Deputies did this by unanimous consent. Definitions of abandonment were also changed, as they were not consistent for both sexes with women previously only being able to claim abandonment if her husband forced his wife to support his mistress while they were living in the same house. On 7 October 1978, the law was changed to decriminalize the sale of contraceptives, along with information on how to use them. The Senate bill that passed to decriminalize adultery was different than the one passed by Congress. Consequently, for the first time the Joint Congress-Senate Committee had to meet to reconcile these differences. The primary issue was whether adultery could be used as a reason to disinherit someone, with Congress saying it could not be invoked while the Senate maintained it could be. In the end, the version put forth by Congress was accepted.

National Federation of Progressive Women President Yolanda Besteiro de la Fuente said of the rescinding of this law, "It meant overcoming a historical discrimination of women, who could be punished with six years in prison if they committed adultery, faced with the impunity of this same behavior if committed by a man. It consecrated the freedom of women in their sexual relations and produced an authentic social transformation changing the traditional concept of marriage and, therefore, of the family."
