= Hall (surname) =

Origin
- Region of origin: England and Scotland

Hall is a surname of Anglo-Celtic origin.

== History ==
=== England ===
The first bearers of the surname Hall came to England in the great wave of migration that followed the Norman Conquest of 1066.

The surname Hall was first found in Lincolnshire, England, where the family was granted lands after the Norman Conquest in 1066. The Hall family is directly descended Earl Fitzwilliam, who held a family seat at Greatford Hall in Lincolnshire, after the Norman Conquest. The younger son of this noble house, Arthur FitzWilliam, came to be known as "Hall" so as to distinguish him from his senior brother. Hence, Arthur Hall was the first known bearer of the name, appearing on record about the year 1090.

Many of the Norman noblemen who came to England with William the Conqueror soon grew dissatisfied with William's rule; as such, members of the Hall family accepted land grants from King Malcolm III of Scotland, and became prominent in that country.

=== Scotland ===
In Scotland, the name in Latin was de Aula and accordingly, the first record here was "Waldeu de Aula who witnessed a charter by Walter de Veteri Ponte a. 1200."

Over one hundred years later the English version of the name was in use as "John of the Hall was one of an inquest made at Berwick, 1302 and c. 1311 Thomas dictus del Halle witnessed resignation by Adam de Dowane of his land of Grenryg in the barony of Lesmahagow."

The first Hall of Fulbar in Renfrewshire was Thomas de Aula, surgeon, who for his faithful service obtained from Robert II a grant of land in the tenement of Staneley, barony of Renffrow, 1370."

== Clan Hall ==
In northern England and southern Scotland, the Halls (Clan Hall) became one of sixty major riding families of the area known as the English and Scottish Marches, including the Debatable Lands. They were involved in cross-border raids to steal cattle and other property, known as reiving, as many other border clans were. As with the majority of reiving families, they would consider themselves loyal to neither the crowns of England nor Scotland, the family name holding allegiance over all else.

The traditional Scottish homes of Clan Hall were at Redesdale, East Teviotdale, and Liddesdale. Other Halls lived in Aynstrother; Glenryg, in the barony of Lesmahagow; Garvald; Irvide; Glasgow; Sancharmvr, in Preswick; and Perth. There were also large numbers of Clan Hall over the border in England, in what is modern-day Northumberland, where the Hall name remains common.

As recounted in the song "The Death of Parcy Reed", members of Clan Hall betrayed and stand idly by as the Laird of Troughend, Parcy Reed, was murdered by the Crosier Clan. This betrayal added to their reputation as one of the most notorious border clans.

Mad Jack Hall was a well-known member of the Clan.

== The Hall name today ==
Today, the name is found throughout the world as a consequence of large scale emigration from England and Scotland from the 16th century onwards. The name is especially common in the United States, Canada and Australia.

Today, with about 181,000 namesakes Hall is the 17th most popular surname in England and Wales. Around the world Halls are most common in Melbourne (one in 582 families), Canberra (one in 590) and Sydney (one in 601). The United States has more Halls than the entire population of Bristol-an estimated total of just over 494,000 makes this their 24th most popular surname.

== Notable people ==
=== A ===
- Aamir Hall (born 2001), American football player
- Addison Hall (1797–1871), American politician
- Adélaïde Victoire Hall (1772–1844), Swedish-French artist
- Agiye Hall (born 2002), American football player
- Agnes C. Hall (1777–1846), Scottish writer
- Ahmard Hall (born 1979), American football player
- Ailsa Hall, British researcher
- Ainsley Hall (born 1972), Caymanian cricketer
- Alaina Reed Hall (1946–2009), American actress
- Alan Hall (1952–2015), British biologist
- Alaric Hall (born 1979), British philologist
- Alberta Neiswanger Hall (1870–1956), American composer
- Aled Hall (born 1968), Welsh musician
- Aleksander Hall (born 1953), Polish politician
- Alexandra Hall Hall (born 1964), British diplomat
- Alf Hall (1896–1964), South African cricketer
- Alice Hall (1917–2000), Belgian-American musician
- Alicia Hall (born 1985), American fashion model
- Alison Hall (1910–2004), New Zealand cricket player
- Almer Hall (1912–1994), English footballer
- Amos T. Hall (1896–1971), American lawyer and judge
- Amy Hall, English actress
- Andrea Hall (born 1947), American actress
- Andreas Hall (1824–1849), American serial killer
- Andria Hall (1956–2025), British ballerina
- Andy Hall (activist) (born 1979), English activist
- Andy Hall (American football) (born 1980), American football player
- Angela Hall (born 1958), New Zealand footballer
- Angeline Stickney Hall (1830–1892), American academic
- Angus Hall (born 2005), English rugby union footballer
- Anita Hall, American politician
- Ann Hall (1792–1863), American painter
- Anne Hall, American diplomat
- Annie Hall (high sheriff) (1949/1950–2019), British businesswoman
- Ansel Franklin Hall (1894–1962), American naturalist
- A. Oakey Hall (1826–1898), American politician
- A. P. Hall Jr. (1880–1967), American football coach
- Ardelia Ripley Hall (1899–1979), American civil servant
- Arman Hall (born 1994), American sprinter
- Armstrong Hall (1853–1921), English archdeacon
- Arnold Alexander Hall (1915–2000), English engineer
- Arsenio Hall (born 1955), American journalist
- Artie Hall (1881–1939), American actress
- A. Rupert Hall (1920–2009), British historian
- Asa Hall (born 1986), English footballer
- Asaph Hall (1829–1907), American astronomer
- Asaph Hall Jr. (1859–1939), American astronomer
- Aston J. Hall, Canadian judge
- Augusta Hall (1802–1896), Welsh philanthropist
- Augustus Hall (1814–1861), American politician
- Aylmer Hall (1914–1987), British author

=== B ===
- Bambi Hall (born 1992), Canadian wrestler
- Barney Hall (1932–2016), American sports commentator
- Barrie Lee Hall Jr. (1949–2011), American trumpeter
- Baxter Hall (1757–1842), American military officer
- Bayley Hall (born 2003), Australian racing driver
- Baynard Rush Hall (1793–1863), American academic
- Benoni Hall (1710–1779), American judge
- Benton Jay Hall (1835–1894), American politician
- Bernadette Hall (born 1945), New Zealand playwright
- Berta Hall (1909–1999), Swedish actress
- Beryl Patricia Hall (1917–2010), British ornithologist
- Bessie Hall (1849–1930), English seafarer
- Beth Hall, American actress
- Betty Hall (1921–2018), American politician
- Betty Hall (actress), English child actress
- Betty Jean Hall (1946–2024), American lawyer
- Beverly Hall (1946–2015), Jamaican-American education administrator
- Birger Martin Hall (1741–1815), Swedish botanist
- B. J. Hall (born 1985), American football player
- Blainey Hall (1889–1975), American baseball player
- Bob Hall (wheelchair athlete) (1951–2026), American wheelchair racer and wheelchair designer
- Bobbye Hall (born 1950), American percussionist
- Bolling Hall (1767–1836), American politician
- Bolton Hall (activist) (1854–1938), American lawyer
- Brad Hall (born 1958), American actor
- Brad Hall (bobsledder) (born 1990), British bobsledder
- Brad Hall (politician), American politician
- Bree Hall (born 2003), American basketball player
- Breece Hall (born 2001), American football player
- Brendan Hall (born 1966), Australian rugby league footballer
- Brenden Hall (born 1993), Australian Paralympic swimmer
- Brent Hall (born 1986), Australian footballer
- Brett Hall, American politician
- Bridget Hall (born 1977), American model
- Brinsley Hall (1862–1940), Australian politician
- Bronwyn Hall, American economist
- Bryce Hall (born 1999), American social media personality
- Bryce Hall (American football) (born 1997), American football player
- Bryn Hall (rugby union) (born 1992), New Zealand rugby union footballer
- Buddy Hall (1945–2025), American pool player
- Bug Hall (born 1985), American actor
- Burton Hall (judge) (born 1947), Bahamian judge

=== C ===
- Cade Hall (born 2000), American football player
- Caley Hall (born 1975), New Zealand artist
- Calum Hall (born 2000), Scottish footballer
- Calvin S. Hall (1909–1985), American psychologist
- Camilla Hall (1945–1974), American activist
- Carla Hall (born 1964), American chef
- Carlos Hall (born 1979), American football player
- Carlotta Case Hall (1880–1949), American botanist
- Carlton Hall (born 1975), American football coach
- Carolyn Hall, American politician
- Carrie Hall (1874–1963), American nurse
- Carrie Hall (engineer), American engineer
- Cecil Hall (1804–1844), English archdeacon
- Cecilia Häll (born 1978), Swedish actress
- Chad Hall (born 1986), American football coach and player
- Chambers Hall (1786–1855), English art collector
- Chapin Hall (1816–1879), American politician
- Cheryl Hall (born 1950), British actress
- Chester Moore Hall (1703–1771), British astronomer
- Chip Hall (born 1973), American television produc
- Christina Hall (born 1983), American real estate investor
- Christian Hall (2001–2020), Asian-American man killed by police
- Christo Hall (born 1978), Australian entrepreneur
- Christy Hall, American film director
- Claire-Marie Hall, Filipino-British actress
- Clark Hall (politician), American politician
- Clara W. Hall (1930–2014), American chemist
- Clarrie Hall (1890–1976), Australian footballer
- Claude Hall (1932–2017), American journalist
- Clay Hall (footballer) (born 2005), Australian rules footballer
- Clement Hall (1706–1759), English missionary
- Cleve Hall (1959–2021), American make-up artist
- Clifton A. Hall (1826–1913), American architect
- Clinton J. Hall (1926–1984), American lawyer and politician
- Cody Hall (born 1991), American wrestler
- Cody Hall (baseball) (born 1988), American baseball player
- Colette Hall (born 1973), British tennis player
- Colin Hall (born 1948), English footballer
- Coombe Hall (1871–1932), Scottish footballer
- Connie Hall (1929–2021), American musician
- Conor Hall (born 1995), British archer
- Conrad Hall (1926–2003), American cinematographer
- Conrad W. Hall (born 1958), American cinematographer
- Coombe Hall (1871–1932), Scottish footballer
- Corinne Hall (born 1987), Australian cricketer
- Cornelia Hall (1842–1911), Hawaiian philanthropist
- Corrine Hall (born 1991), English cyclist
- Cory Hall (born 1976), American football player
- Courtney Hall (1968–2021), American football player
- Covington Hall (1871–1952), American labor organizer
- Crip Hall (1901–1961), American lawyer and politician
- Crystal Monee Hall, American actress
- Cyril Hall (1889–1979), Australian rules footballer

=== D ===
- Daeshon Hall (born 1995), American football player
- Dahéli Hall (born 1976), American actress
- Dale Hall (1924–1996), American football coach
- Damian Hall (born 1975), British runner and activist
- Danniebelle Hall (1938–2000), American musician
- Dannielle Hall, Australian actress
- Danny Hall (baseball) (born 1954), American baseball coach
- Danny Hall (field hockey) (born 1974), British field hockey player
- Danny Hall (footballer) (born 1983), English footballer
- Dante Hall (born 1978), American football player
- Darick Hall (born 1995), American baseball player
- Darnell Hall (born 1971), American athlete
- Daryl Hall (born 1949), American musician
- Darwin Hall (1844–1919), American politician
- Davey Hall (born 1951), British trade unionist
- DeAngelo Hall (born 1983), American football player
- Deidre Hall (born 1947), American actress
- Deiondre' Hall (born 1994), American football player
- Del Hall (born 1949), Canadian ice hockey player
- Delores Hall, American actress
- Delton Hall (born 1965), American football player
- Demene Hall (1949–2018), American actress
- Denis Hall, Scottish professor
- Denis Hall (bishop) (1899–1983), British bishop
- Dennis Hall (born 1971), American wrestler
- Dennis Hall (footballer) (1923–2005), Australian rules footballer
- Denzel Hall (born 2001), Dutch footballer
- Derick Hall (born 2001), American football player
- Destin Hall (born 1987), American attorney and politician
- Devon Hall (born 1995), American basketball player
- De'von Hall (born 1987), American football player
- D. G. E. Hall (1892–1979), British historian
- Diana Hall, Australian soccer player
- Dilmus Hall (1896–1967), American sculptor
- Dino Hall (born 1955), American football player
- Dior Hall (born 1996), American hurdler
- D. J. Hall (born 1986), American football player
- DL Hall (born 1998), American baseball player
- Dollie Radler Hall (1897–1995), American geologist
- Dolly Hall (born 1960), American film producer
- Donta Hall (born 1997), American basketball player
- Doreen Hall (1921–2025), Canadian violinist
- Drew Hall (born 1963), American baseball player
- Duane Hall (born 1967), American politician and attorney
- Duncan Hall (1925–2011), Australian rugby league footballer
- Duncan Hall Jr. (born 1956), Australian rugby league footballer
- Durward Gorham Hall (1910–2001), American politician

=== E ===
- Earl D. Hall (1879–1959), American politician
- Earle B. Hall (1919–1941), American naval officer
- Edd Hall (born 1958), American television announcer
- Eddie Hall (born 1988), British strongman
- Edgar Hall (1888–1987), English priest
- Edith Hall (born 1959), British academic
- Edmond Hall (1901–1967), American musician
- Edna Clarke Hall (1879–1979), English artist
- Elbert Hall (1882–1935), American baseball player
- Eldon C. Hall (1923–2022), American computer specialist
- Eleanor Hall, Australian journalist
- Eleanor L. Hall (born 1947), American psychologist
- Elise Hall (born 1989), American politician
- Elise Hall (musician) (1853–1924), American saxophonist
- Eliza Hall (1847–1916), Australian philanthropist
- Eliza Calvert Hall (1856–1935), American author
- Elizeus Hall (1502–1565), English prophet
- Ella Hall (1896–1982), American actress
- Ellen Hall (1922–1999), American actress
- Elmer E. Hall (1890–1958), American marine officer
- Elsie Hall (1877–1976), Australian-South African pianist
- Elvina M. Hall (1820–1899), American lyricist
- Elwin Hall (1891–1949), American rugby union footballer
- Emanuel Hall (born 1997), American football player
- Emily Hall (born 1978), American musician
- Emma Amelia Hall (1837–1884), American activist
- Emmett C. Hall (1882–1956), American screenwriter
- Emmett Matthew Hall (1898–1995), Canadian judge
- Ephraim B. Hall (1822–1898), American politician
- Erasmus D. Hall (1812–1878), American politician
- Ervin Hall (born 1947), American athlete
- Esther Hall (born 1973), British actress
- Ethel Hall (1898–1927), American actress
- Ethel Harris Hall (1928–2011), American educator
- Eugene Raymond Hall (1902–1986), American zoologist
- Eula Hall (1927–2021), American health activist
- Evangeline Rachel Hall (1882–1947), American educator
- Evan Stephens Hall (born 1989), American singer-songwriter
- Eve Hall (1937–2007), French-South African activist
- Evelyn Beatrice Hall (1868–1956), British author
- Evelyne Hall (1909–1993), American athlete
- Everett Hall (1901–1960), American philosopher

=== F ===
- Faron Hall (1964–2014), Canadian social figure
- Farrah Hall (born 1981), American sport sailor
- Fawn Hall (born 1959), American secretary
- Ferrakohn Hall (born 1990), American basketball player
- Fergus Hall (born 1947), Scottish artist
- Fitz Hall (born 1980), English footballer
- Fitzedward Hall (1825–1901), American orientalist
- Floyd Hall (born 1938), American businessman
- Floyd D. Hall (1916–2012), American businessman
- Forrest Hall (1921–2001), American football player
- Forrest M. Hall (1869–1961), American football coach
- Frances Elliott Mann Hall (1853–1935), American teacher
- Fransisca Hall, British singer-songwriter
- Freddy Hall (1985–2022), Bermudian footballer
- Fretwell Hall (1892–1937), English footballer

=== G ===
- Gabe Hall (born 2001), American football player
- Gabriella Hall (born 1966), American actress
- Gage John Hall (c.1775–1854), British army officer
- Galen Hall (born 1940), American football coach
- Gareth Hall (born 1969), Welsh footballer
- Garnet Hall, American politician
- Garth Hall (born 1945), American football coach
- Gene Hall (1913–1993), American professor
- Georgia Hall (born 1996), English golfer
- Geri Hall (born 1972), Canadian actress and comedian
- Gerri Hall (born 1934), American singer
- Gertrude Hall (1863–1961), American poet
- Gita Hall (1933–2016), Swedish-American actress
- Gladys Hall (1891–1977), American journalist
- Glenda Hall (born 1964), Australian cricketer
- Glenn Hall (1931–2026), Canadian ice hockey player
- Glenvil Hall (1887–1962), British politician
- G. Norman Hall (1885–1965), South African pathologist
- Godfrey Hall (racing driver) (born 1949), British racing driver
- GP Hall (born 1943), English musician
- Grace Hall (born 2002), English cricketer
- Grady Hall, American film director
- Grahame Hall (1919–1982), Australian rules footballer
- Granger Hall (basketball) (born 1962), American basketball player
- Grant Hall (born 1991), English footballer
- Grayson Hall (1922–1985), American actress
- Granville D. Hall (1837–1934), American journalist
- Grover C. Hall (1888–1941), American newspaper editor
- Grover Cleveland Hall Jr. (1915–1971), American newspaper editor
- G. Stanley Hall (1844–1924), American psychologist
- Gunvor Hall (1908–1961), Norwegian actress
- Gus Hall (1910–2000), American politician
- Guthrie Hall (born 1984), South African rugby union footballer
- Gwen Hall (1951–2007), American activist

=== H ===
- Halsey Hall (1898–1977), American sportswriter
- Hanna R. Hall (born 1984), American actress
- Harber H. Hall (1920–2020), American politician
- Harmon Hall (1818–1891), American shoe manufacturer and politician
- Harriet Hall (1945–2023), American physician
- Hassan Hall (born 2000), American football player
- H. Dalton Hall (1881–1946), Australian artist
- Helen Hall, American collector
- Herbie Hall (1926–2013), British wrestler
- Herman Hall (1864–1928), American army officer
- Hiland Hall (1795–1885), American politician
- Hillary Hall (born 1965), American politician
- Homer W. Hall (1870–1954), American politician
- Horatio Ernest Hall (1861–1919), English cricketer
- H. Palmer Hall (1942–2013), American poet
- Huntz Hall (1919–1999), American actor
- Hurley Hall (born 1935), American politician

=== I ===
- Ian Hall, British statistician
- Ilan Hall (born 1982), American chef
- Ingrid Hall, New Zealand footballer
- Ira Hall (1892–1987), American race car driver
- Irene Hall (1888–1961), Australian nurse
- Iris Hall (1892–1984), Barbadian-American actor
- Irma P. Hall (1935–2026), American actress
- Irv Hall (1918–2006), American baseball player
- Irv Hall (American football) (1913–1964), American football player
- Isaac Hollister Hall (1837–1896), American orientalist
- Isaac Walker Hall (1868–1953), British pathologist
- Isadore Hall III (born 1971), American politician
- Ivan Hall (1932–2026), English historian
- Ivan P. Hall (1932–2023), American historian

=== J ===
- Jacob Hall, English rope-dancer
- Jacob Hall (pirate), English pirate
- Jacquelyn Dowd Hall (born 1943), American historian
- Jaida Essence Hall (born 1988), American drag queen
- Jake Hall (basketball), American college basketball player
- Jake Hall (TV personality) (1990–2026), English television personality, model and entrepreneur
- Jalyn Hall (born 2006), American actor
- Jamie Hall (born 1968), English cricketer
- Jan Hall (cricketer) (born 1958), New Zealand cricketer
- Janine Hall (1952/1953–2008), New Zealand musician
- Jaren Hall (born 1998), American football player
- Jasper Hall (??–1778), English politician
- J. Camille Hall, American academic administrator
- Jean Hall (1896–1982), Canadian architect
- J. Edward Hall (1851–1889), American trade union organizer
- Jefferson Hall (actor) (born 1977), English actor
- Jenna Hall (born 1984), American softball coach
- Jeremiah Hall (born 1998), American football player
- Jermaine Hall (born 1980), American basketball player
- Jerome Hall (1901–1992), American academic
- Jerry Hall (born 1956), British-American model
- Jess Hall, British cinematographer
- Jesse Lee Hall (1849–1911), American soldier
- J. Gilbert Hall (1898–1977), American tennis player
- J. H. Hall (1877–1942), English trade unionist
- Jill Hall (born 1949), Australian politician
- Jill Hall (athlete) (born 1946), English athlete
- Jillian Hall (born 1980), American wrestler
- Jimmie Hall (born 1938), American baseball player
- Jimmie C. Hall (born 1947), American politician
- Jimmy Hall (born 1949), American singer
- Jimmy Hall (basketball) (born 1994), American basketball player
- J. M. Hall (1851–1935), American businessman
- Jo Hall (born 1958), Australian television presenter
- Joan Hall (British politician) (1935–2026), British politician
- Johanna Hall (1934–1996), British equestrian
- Joice M. Hall (born 1943), Canadian artist
- Jordon Hall (born 1998), Australian footballer
- Josie Briggs Hall (1869–1935), American writer
- Joyce Hall (1891–1982), American businessman
- J. Storrs Hall, American scientist
- Juanita Hall (1901–1968), American actress
- Jude Hall (??–1827), American soldier
- Judson Hall (1855–1938), American politician
- Julia Brainerd Hall (1859–1926), American scientist
- Julia R. Hall (1865–1918), American physician
- Juliana Hall (born 1958), American composer
- Justin Hall (born 1974), American journalist
- Justin Hall (American football) (born 1999), American football player
- Justin Hall (cartoonist) (born 1971), American cartoonist

=== K ===
- Kahmora Hall (born 1991), American drag performer
- Karen Hall (born 1956), American screenwriter
- Karoniaktajeh Louis Hall (1918–1993), Native American artist
- Karyn Hall (born 1980), American soccer player
- Katarzyna Hall (born 1957), Polish educator
- Kathleen Anne Baird Hall (1896–1970), New Zealand nurse
- Kathy Hall (born 1956), New Zealand footballer
- Katori Hall (born 1981), American playwright
- Katy Hall, American politician
- Kaye Hall (born 1951), American swimmer
- Keegan Hall (born 1981), American artist
- Kemon Hall (born 1997), American football player
- Kenny Hall (musician) (1923–2013), American musician and teacher
- Kermit L. Hall (1944–2006), American educator
- Kevan Hall (born 1957), American fashion designer
- Keyshawn Hall (born 2003), American basketball player
- Khesanio Hall (born 1994), Jamaican footballer
- Kira Hall, American anthropologist
- Kim F. Hall (born 1961), English professor
- Klay Hall (born 1958), American animator
- Kole Hall (born 1998), Bermudian footballer
- Korey Hall (born 1983), American football player
- Kristen Hall (born 1962), American musician
- Kwanza Hall (born 1971), American politician and businessman
- Kyle Hall (born 1990), American businessman and politician

=== L ===
- Lance Hall (1915–1985), English footballer
- Langston Hall (born 1991), American basketball player
- Lani Hall (born 1945), American singer
- Lars Hall (1927–1991), Swedish athlete
- Lars Hall (art director) (1938–2018), Swedish art director
- LaShann DeArcy Hall (born 1970), American judge
- Lauren Hall (born 1979), American cyclist
- Laurence Hall (born 1984), English footballer
- Leamon Hall (born 1955), American football player
- Lemanski Hall (born 1970), American football player
- Lena Hall (born 1980), American actress
- Lene Hall, Barbadian model
- Leola Hall (1881–1930), American architect
- Leon Hall (born 1984), American football player
- Les Hall, American musician
- Lesley Hall (1954–2013), Australian activist
- Leslie Hall (born 1981), American musician
- Lianne Hall, English singer
- Lillian Haydon Childress Hall (1889–1958), American librarian
- Lincoln Hall (climber) (1956–2012), Australian mountaineer
- Linden Hall (athlete) (born 1991), Australian runner
- Lindsay Bernard Hall (1859–1935), Australian artist
- Livingston Hall (1903–1995), American professor
- Lloimincia Hall (born 1993), American artistic gymnast
- Lloyd Hall (1894–1971), American chemist
- Logan Hall (born 2000), American football player
- Lois Hall (1926–2006), American actress
- Lola Hall (born 1933), American journalist
- Loreen Hall (born 1967), English sprinter
- Lot Hall (1757–1809), American attorney
- Louis Hall (1852–1915), English cricketer
- Louis Hall (footballer) (born 1999), English footballer
- Louisa Hall (born 1982), American squash player
- Louisa Jane Hall (1802–1892), American writer and literary critic
- Lucinda Armstrong Hall, Australian actress
- Luther E. Hall (1869–1921), American politician
- Lyall Hall (1861–1935), Australian politician
- Lyman Hall (1724–1790), American politician
- Lyman Hall (academic) (1859–1905), American academic
- Lydia Hall (born 1987), Welsh golfer
- Lydia Elizabeth Hall (1864–1916), Canadian evangelist
- Lynden David Hall (1974–2006), British musician

=== M ===
- Maddison Hall (born 1964), Australian murderer
- Mad Jack Hall (1672–1716), English religious leader
- Maggie Hall (1853–1888), Irish-born prostitute
- Magnus Hall (born 1958), Swedish businessman
- Malcolm Hall (fashion designer) (born 1947), British fashion designer
- Malik Hall (born 2000), American basketball player
- Manly Palmer Hall (1901–1990), Canadian author
- Marc Hall (born 1985), Canadian activist
- Marc Hall (baseball) (1887–1915), American baseball player
- Marcia Hall (born 1939), American art historian
- Marcellus Hall, American artist
- Marcus Hall (born 1976), English footballer
- Marcus Hall (basketball) (born 1985), American basketball player
- Margit Hall (1901–1937), Swedish architect
- Marguerite Higgins Hall (1920–1966), American war correspondent
- Maria M. C. Hall (1836–1912), American nurse
- Marie Hall (1884–1956), English violinist
- Marielle Hall (born 1992), American runner
- Marilyn Hall (1927–2017), Canadian-American television producer
- Marta Thoma Hall (born 1951), American painter
- Marvin Hall (born 1993), American football player
- Matheau Hall (born 1987), American soccer player
- Mathilda Hall (1833–1894), Swedish educator
- Matthew Hall (born 1967), British screenwriter and novelist.
- Máximo Soto Hall (1871–1944), Guatemalan novelist
- Maxwell Hall (1884–1966), British colonial administrator
- Megan Hall (triathlete) (born 1974), South African triathlete
- Megan Hall (poet) (born 1972), South African writer
- Mel Hall (born 1960), American baseball player
- Melanie Hall (basketball) (born 1977), Australian athlete
- Melmoth Hall (1811–1885), Australian cricketer
- Melvin Hall (1915–2001), American unicyclist
- Mere Haana Hall (1881–1966), New Zealand teacher
- Meredith Hall (born 1949), American writer
- Millard Hall (1926–2005), American journalist
- Min Hall, New Zealand architect
- Mindy Hall, American makeup artist
- Minna B. Hall (1859–1951), American socialite and environmentalist
- Minor Hall (1897–1959), American drummer
- Miriam Hall (1877–1954), American tennis player
- Mitchell K. Hall, American historian
- Monica Hall, English guitarist
- Monty Hall (1921–2017), Canadian-American television presenter
- Moritz Hall (1838–1914), Polish-American metalworker
- Mordaunt Hall (1878–1973), American film critic
- Muriel Hall, American politician

=== N ===
- Nancy Hall (1904–1991), American politician
- Naomi Hall, American musician
- Natalie Hall (born 1990), Canadian actress and singer
- Nate Hall (born 1996), American football player
- Neil Hall, British academic
- Nellie Hall (1895–1976), British suffragette
- Nevil Hall (1915–1987), South African wrestler
- Newt H. Hall (1873–1939), American military officer
- Nicholas Hall, Australian jockey
- Nickie Hall (1959–2024), American football player
- Nicola Hall (born 1969), English guitarist
- Nicole Hall (born 2004), Swedish ice hockey player
- Nim Hall (1925–1972), English rugby union footballer
- N. John Hall (born 1933), American biographer
- Norm Hall (1926–1992), American race car driver
- Norm Hall (footballer) (1894–1974), Australian rules footballer
- Norma Bassett Hall (1889–1957), American printmaker

=== O ===
- Oakley Hall (1920–2008), American novelist
- O. B. Grayson Hall Jr. (born 1958), American banking executive
- Obed Hall (1757–1828), American politician
- Ollie Hall (1952–2020), Australian actor
- Oscar A. Hall (1923–2004), American politician
- Osee M. Hall (1847–1914), American politician
- Owen Hall (1853–1907), British librettist

=== P ===
- Pam Hall, Jamaican singer
- Pam Hall (artist) (born 1951), Canadian artist
- Pam Mark Hall (born 1951), American singer-songwriter
- Papa Hall (1931–2010), American athlete
- Paris Hall (born 2003), Australian cricketer
- Pat Hall (1917–2010), British ornithologist
- Pauline Hall (1860–1919), American actress
- Pauline Hall (composer) (1890–1969), Norwegian composer
- Peirson M. Hall (1894–1979), American politician
- Perry Hall (baseball) (1898–1993), American baseball player
- Pete Hall (born 1939), American football player
- Philip Hall (1904–1982), English mathematician
- Philip Hall (diplomat) (born 1967), British diplomat
- Philo Hall (1865–1938), American politician
- Pike Hall Jr. (1931–1999), American judge
- Pip Hall (born 1971), New Zealand actress
- P. J. Hall (born 1995), American football player
- PJ Hall (basketball) (born 2002), American basketball player
- Pooch Hall (born 1976), American actor
- Porter Hall (1888–1953), American actor
- Prathia Hall (1940–2002), American activist
- Prescott F. Hall (1868–1921), American lawyer
- Prince Hall (1735–1807), American freemason
- Primus Hall (1756–1842), American abolitionist

=== Q ===
- Quincy Hall (born 1998), American track and field athlete

=== R ===
- Rachel Howzell Hall (born 1970), American author
- Radclyffe Hall (1880–1943), British author
- Raewyn Hall, New Zealand footballer
- Ralph Hall (1923–2019), American politician
- Ralph Hall (MP) (??–1577), English politician
- Randall Hall, American politician
- Randy Hall, American musician
- Randy Hall (American football) (born 1952), American football player
- Rannell Hall (born 1993), American football player
- Rebecca Hall (born 1982), English actress
- Rebecca Hall (musician) (born 1965), American musician
- Reece Hall (born 2003), English footballer
- Reg Hall (1932–2013), Australian rules footballer
- Regina Hall (born 1970), American actress
- Reginald Hall (1870–1943), British intelligence officer
- Reginald Hall (endocrinologist) (1931–1994), British endocrinologist
- René Hall (1912–1988), American musician
- Reneé Hall (born 1971), American police officer
- Rhett Hall (born 1968), American football player
- Ria Hall (born 1982/1983), New Zealand recording artist
- Rick Hall (1932–2018), American record producer
- Rob Hall (1961–1996), New Zealand mountain climber
- Robin Hall (1936–1998), Scottish musician
- Robley Hall, American politician
- Roderick Stephen Hall (1915–1945), American military officer
- Ronald Hall (1895–1975), British missionary
- Ronald Acott Hall (1892–1966), British diplomat
- Rosalind Hall, Welsh choral director
- Rosalys Hall (1914–2006), American author
- Rosemary Hall (political activist) (1925–2011), Scottish political activist
- Rosetta Sherwood Hall (1865–1951), Canadian missionary
- Ross Hall (politician) (1925–1999), Canadian politician
- Rubye Hibler Hall (1912–2003), American educator
- Russ Hall (1871–1937), American baseball player

=== S ===
- Samantha Hall (born 1982), Australian environmentalist
- Samantha Hall (discus thrower) (born 1993), Jamaican discus thrower
- Sandra Hall (born 1951), American singer-songwriter
- Sandra Hall (writer), Australian film critic
- Sands Hall (born 1952), American writer
- Saniyah Hall (born 2008), American basketball player
- Sara Hall (born 1983), American distance runner
- Seaman Nobby Hall (1892–1953), Scottish boxer
- Sean Hall (born 1967), American rower
- Sean Hall (curler), Australian curler
- Selina Hall (1780–1853), British engraver
- Sell Hall (1888–1951), American music promoter
- Shadrach A. Hall (1835–1915), American farmer and politician
- Shane Hall (born 1969), American race car driver
- Shannon Hall (born 1970), American boxer
- Sharlot Hall (1870–1943), American journalist
- Sharon J. Hall, American ecologist and professor
- Sheldon Hall (film historian) (born 1964), British film historian
- Sherona Hall (1948–2006), Jamaican activist
- Shyima Hall (born 1989), Egyptian activist
- Sincere Hall (born 2004), Bermudian footballer
- Sonny Hall (born 1998), English model
- Sonny Hall (unionist) (1932–2022), American labor union leader
- Sophia Hall (born 1943), American judge
- Sophie Hall (born 1989), British-American model
- Spencer Hall (1805–1875), English librarian
- Spencer Timothy Hall (1812–1885), English writer and mesmerist
- Stan Hall (1917–1999), English footballer
- Steele Hall (1928–2024), Australian politician
- Steele Hall (baseball) (born 2007), American baseball player
- Stephen Hall (disambiguation), multiple people
- Stewart Hall (football coach) (born 1959), English football coach
- Stuart Hall (bishop) (born 1962), Australian Roman Catholic bishop
- Susan Hall (born 1955), British politician
- Susan Hall (artist) (born 1943), American artist
- Susanna Hall (1583–1648), English socialite
- Suzan Hall, Canadian politician
- Sylvester Hall (1910–1988), American football and basketball coach

=== T ===
- Tally Hall (soccer) (born 1985), American soccer player
- Tamron Hall (born 1970), American journalist
- Tarquin Hall (born 1969), British writer
- Taylor Hall (born 1991), Canadian ice hockey player
- Teepoo Hall (1858–1909), Australian physician
- Terez Hall (born 1996), American football player
- Terri Hall (1953–2007), American adult film actress
- Terrie Hall (1960–2013), American activist
- Tex G. Hall (born 1956), Native American politician
- Theodora Hall (1902–1980), New Zealand doctor
- Theodore Hall (1925–1999), American physicist and spy
- Thurston Hall (1882–1958), American actor
- Tiffany Margaret Hall (born 1963), British engineer
- Tiffiny Hall (born 1984), Australian personal trainer
- Timothy Hall (born 1944), English cricketer
- Timothy Hall (bishop) (1637–1690), English bishop
- TJ Hall (born 2004), American football player
- Toby Hall (born 1975), American baseball player
- Todd Michael Hall (born 1969), American musician
- Todrick Hall (born 1985), American rapper
- Too Tall Hall (born 1982), American basketball player
- Tord Hall (1910–1987), Swedish mathematician
- T. Proctor Hall (1858–1931), Canadian physician
- Tracey Hall, American basketball player
- Tracie D. Hall (born 1968), American librarian
- Tracy Hall (1919–2008), American inventor
- Tracy D. Hall, American academic administrator
- Trish Hall, American journalist
- Troy Hall (born 1982), New Zealand-American rugby union footballer
- Tubby Hall (1895–1945), American musician
- Tyrese Hall (born 2005), English footballer
- Tyrone Hall (born 1989), American soccer player

=== U ===
- Uriah Hall (born 1984), Jamaican-American mixed martial artist
- Uriel Sebree Hall (1852–1932), American politician

=== V ===
- Valentine Hall (1867–1934), American tennis player
- Valentine Hall Jr. (1834–1880), American banker
- Valerie Hall (1946–2016), British paleoecologist
- Valyn Hall (born 1985), American actress
- Vera Hall (1902–1964), American singer
- Vic Hall (born 1986), American football player
- Vic Hall (novelist) (1896–1972), Australian novelist
- Vicki Hall (born 1969), American basketball coach
- Vicky Hall (born 1977), English actress
- Vince Hall (born 1984), American football player
- Virginia Hall (1906–1982), American spy

=== W ===
- Wallace L. Hall Jr., American investor
- Warren D. C. Hall (1788–1867), American politician
- Wendell Hall (1896–1969), American musician
- Wendy Hall (born 1952), British academic
- Wes Hall (born 1937), West Indian cricketer
- Wes Hall (businessman), Canadian businessman and academic administrator
- Whaley Hall (1941–2015), American football player
- Wilbur Hall (musician) (1894–1983), American musician
- Wilf Hall (1934–2007), English footballer
- Wilfrid Hall (1892–1965), British entomologist
- Willard Hall (1780–1875), American politician
- Willard Preble Hall (1820–1882), American politician
- William Hall (missionary) (1788–1844), a lay person of the Church Missionary Society
- Wilmer L. Hall (1885–1957), American author
- Wilson Hall (rugby league) (1900-??), New Zealand rugby league footballer
- Wilton E. Hall (1901–1980), American politician
- Windlan Hall (born 1950), American football player
- Winfield S. Hall (1861–1942), American physiologist
- Winsloe Hall (1869–1936), conductor and singing teacher in Australia
- Winslow Hall (rower) (1912–1995), American rower
- Winter Hall (1872–1947), New Zealand actor
- Wynton Hall, American author

=== Y ===
- Yuliya Hall (born 1975), American gymnast

=== Z ===
- Zac Hall, Manx politician
- Zach Hall (born 1994/1995), American politician
- Zachariah Adam Hall (1865–1952), Canadian politician
- Zuri Hall (born 1988), American television personality

== Disambiguation pages ==
=== A ===
- Aaron Hall (disambiguation)
- Adam Hall (disambiguation)
- Adelaide Hall (disambiguation)
- Adrian Hall (disambiguation)
- Al Hall (disambiguation)
- Albert Hall (disambiguation)
- Alex Hall (disambiguation)
- Alexander Hall (disambiguation)
- Alexis Hall (disambiguation)
- Alfred Hall (disambiguation)
- Allan Hall (disambiguation)
- Alvin Hall (disambiguation)
- Amber Hall (disambiguation)
- Andre Hall (disambiguation)
- Andrew Hall (disambiguation)
- Anna Hall (disambiguation)
- Anthony Hall (disambiguation)
- Arch Hall (disambiguation)
- Arthur Hall (disambiguation)
- Ashley Hall (disambiguation)
- Austin Hall (disambiguation)

=== B ===
- Barbara Hall (disambiguation)
- Barry Hall (disambiguation)
- Basil Hall (disambiguation)
- Ben Hall (disambiguation)
- Benjamin Hall (disambiguation)
- Bernard Hall (disambiguation)
- Bert Hall (disambiguation)
- Bill Hall (disambiguation)
- Bob Hall (disambiguation)
- Brandon Hall (disambiguation)
- Brian Hall (disambiguation)
- Bruce Hall (disambiguation)
- Bryan Hall (disambiguation)

=== C ===
- Cameron Hall (disambiguation)
- Carl Hall (disambiguation)
- Carol Hall (disambiguation)
- Caroline Hall (disambiguation)
- Catherine Hall (disambiguation)
- Cecelia Hall (disambiguation)
- Charles Hall (disambiguation)
- Charley Hall (disambiguation)
- Charlie Hall (disambiguation)
- Chris Hall (disambiguation)
- Christopher Hall (disambiguation)
- Chuck Hall (disambiguation)
- Cliff Hall (disambiguation)
- Connor Hall (disambiguation)
- Corey Hall (disambiguation)
- Craig Hall (disambiguation)
- Cynthia Hall (disambiguation)

=== D ===
- Dana Hall (disambiguation)
- Daniel Hall (disambiguation)
- Darren Hall (disambiguation)
- Darryl Hall (disambiguation)
- David Hall (disambiguation)
- Deakin Hall (disambiguation)
- Dean Hall (disambiguation)
- Derek Hall (disambiguation)
- Derrick Hall (disambiguation)
- Dick Hall (disambiguation)
- Don Hall (disambiguation)
- Donald Hall (disambiguation)
- Dorothy Hall (disambiguation)
- Douglas Hall (disambiguation)

=== E ===
- Edmund Hall (disambiguation)
- Edward Hall (disambiguation)
- Edwin Hall (disambiguation)
- Elijah Hall (disambiguation)
- Elizabeth Hall (disambiguation)
- Ellis Hall (disambiguation)
- Eric Hall (disambiguation)
- Ernest Hall (disambiguation)

=== F ===
- Fiona Hall (disambiguation)
- Florence Hall (disambiguation)
- Francis Hall (disambiguation)
- Frank Hall (disambiguation)
- Franklin Hall (disambiguation)
- Frederick Hall (disambiguation)

=== G ===
- Gary Hall (disambiguation)
- Geoff Hall (disambiguation)
- Geoffrey Hall (disambiguation)
- George Hall (disambiguation)
- Glen Hall (disambiguation)
- Gordon Hall (disambiguation)
- Graeme Hall (disambiguation)
- Greg Hall (disambiguation)

=== H ===
- Harold Hall (disambiguation)
- Harry Hall (disambiguation)
- Harvey Hall (disambiguation)
- Hazel Hall (disambiguation)
- Henry Hall (disambiguation)
- Herbert Hall (disambiguation)
- Howard Hall (disambiguation)

=== I ===
- Ian Hall (disambiguation)

=== J ===
- Jack Hall (disambiguation)
- James Hall (disambiguation)
- Jane Hall (disambiguation)
- Janet Hall (disambiguation)
- Jason Hall (disambiguation)
- J. C. Hall (disambiguation)
- Jeff Hall (disambiguation)
- Jennifer Hall (disambiguation)
- Jeremy Hall (disambiguation)
- Jessica Hall (disambiguation)
- Jim Hall (disambiguation)
- Joan Hall (disambiguation)
- Joe Hall (disambiguation)
- John Hall (disambiguation)
- Johnny Hall (disambiguation)
- Jon Hall (disambiguation)
- Jonathan Hall (disambiguation)
- Jordan Hall (disambiguation)
- Joseph Hall (disambiguation)
- Josh Hall (disambiguation)
- Joshua Hall (disambiguation)
- Judith Hall (disambiguation)
- Judy Hall (disambiguation)
- Julian Hall (disambiguation)
- Julie Hall (disambiguation)

=== K ===
- Kate Hall (disambiguation)
- Kathryn Hall (disambiguation)
- Katie Hall (disambiguation)
- Keith Hall (disambiguation)
- Kelly Hall (disambiguation)
- Kenneth Hall (disambiguation)
- Kevin Hall (disambiguation)

=== L ===
- Larry Hall (disambiguation)
- Laura Hall (disambiguation)
- Lawrence Hall (disambiguation)
- Leanne Hall (disambiguation)
- Lee Hall (disambiguation)
- Leonard Hall (disambiguation)
- Lewis Hall (disambiguation)
- Lisa Hall (disambiguation)
- Louise Hall (disambiguation)
- Lucy Hall (disambiguation)
- Luke Hall (disambiguation)

=== M ===
- Margaret Hall (disambiguation)
- Mark Hall (disambiguation)
- Marshall Hall (disambiguation)
- Martin Hall (disambiguation)
- Mary Hall (disambiguation)
- Matt Hall (disambiguation)
- Matthew Hall (disambiguation)
- Max Hall (disambiguation)
- Michael Hall (disambiguation)
- Murray Hall (disambiguation)

=== N ===
- Nathan Hall (disambiguation)
- Newton Hall (disambiguation)
- Nick Hall (disambiguation)
- Nigel Hall (disambiguation)
- Noel Hall (disambiguation)
- Norman Hall (disambiguation)

=== O ===
- Oliver Hall (disambiguation)

=== P ===
- Parker Hall (disambiguation)
- Patricia Hall (disambiguation)
- Patrick Hall (disambiguation)
- Paul Hall (disambiguation)
- Peter Hall (disambiguation)
- Phil Hall (disambiguation)

=== R ===
- Ray Hall (disambiguation)
- Richard Hall (disambiguation)
- Robert Hall (disambiguation)
- Rod Hall (disambiguation)
- Rodney Hall (disambiguation)
- Roger Hall (disambiguation)
- Ron Hall (disambiguation)
- Roy Hall (disambiguation)
- Ruth Hall (disambiguation)
- Ryan Hall (disambiguation)

=== S ===
- Sam Hall (disambiguation)
- Samuel Hall (disambiguation)
- Sarah Hall (disambiguation)
- Scott Hall (disambiguation)
- Simon Hall (disambiguation)
- Skip Hall (disambiguation)
- Stanley Hall (disambiguation)
- Steve Hall (disambiguation)
- Stuart Hall (disambiguation)
- Suzanne Hall (disambiguation)
- Syd Hall (disambiguation)
- Sydney Hall (disambiguation)

=== T ===
- Tanner Hall (disambiguation)
- Taylor Hall (disambiguation)
- Ted Hall (disambiguation)
- Terry Hall (disambiguation)
- Thomas Hall (disambiguation)
- Tim Hall (disambiguation)
- Tom Hall (disambiguation)
- Tommy Hall (disambiguation)
- Tony Hall (disambiguation)
- Travis Hall (disambiguation)
- Trevor Hall (disambiguation)
- Tyler Hall (disambiguation)

=== V ===
- Victor Hall (disambiguation)
- Victoria Hall (disambiguation)

=== W ===
- Walter Hall (disambiguation)
- Wayne Hall (disambiguation)
- William Hall (disambiguation)
- Willie Hall (disambiguation)
- Willis Hall (disambiguation)

== Fictional characters ==
- Shiera Sanders Hall, a character in Hawkgirl comics

== See also ==
- Admiral Hall (disambiguation), a disambiguation page for Admirals surnamed "Hall"
- Attorney General Hall (disambiguation), a disambiguation page for Attorney Generals surnamed "Hall"
- General Hall (disambiguation), a disambiguation page for Generals surnamed "Hall"
- Governor Hall (disambiguation), a disambiguation page for Governors surnamed "Hall"
- Judge Hall (disambiguation), a disambiguation page for Judges surnamed "Hall"
- Justice Hall (disambiguation), a disambiguation page for Justices surnamed "Hall"
- Lord Hall (disambiguation), a disambiguation page for Lords surnamed "Hall"
- Senator Hall (disambiguation), a disambiguation page for Senators surnamed "Hall"
