= Raewyn =

Raewyn is a feminine given name.

== People ==
- Raewyn Alexander (born 1955), New Zealand writer
- Raewyn Atkinson (born 1955), New Zealand ceramicist
- Raewyn Connell (born 1944), Australian sociologist
- Raewyn Dalziel, New Zealand historian
- Raewyn Hall, New Zealand football player
- Raewyn Hill (born 1972), New Zealand-Australian choreographer
- Raewyn Jack (born 1971), New Zealand rhythmic gymnast

== Fictional characters ==
- Raewyn, a character in World of Warcraft
