= Edmund Hall =

Edmund or Edmond Hall may refer to:

== People ==
- Edmund Hall (Australian politician) (1878–1965), Australian politician in Western Australia
- Edmund Hall (MP) (died 1592), English politician
- Edmund Hall (priest) (1620–1687), English royalist-presbyterian priest
- Edmond Hall (1901–1967), American jazz clarinetist

== Buildings ==
- St Edmund Hall, Oxford, part of Oxford University in England
