= Janet Hall =

Janet Hall may refer to:

- Janet C. Hall (born 1948), American district judge
- Janet Clarke Hall, Melbourne, residential college of the University of Melbourne
- Janet E. Hall, Canadian-American physician-scientist and neuroendocrinologist
