= Keith Hall =

Keith Hall may refer to:

- Keith R. Hall (born 1947), director of the U.S. National Reconnaissance Office
- Keith Hall (economist), director of U.S. Congressional Budget Office
- Keith Clifford Hall (1910–1964), British optician, pioneer of contact lenses
- Caskieben, Scottish castle in Aberdeenshire renamed Keith Hall
- Keith Hall (politician) (born 1959), member of the Kentucky House of Representatives
- Keith Hall/Keith Catholic, a school merged into Lowell Catholic High School

== See also ==
- Hall (surname)
