= Simon Hall =

Simon Hall may refer to:

- Simon Hall (chemist) (born 1969), professor of chemistry at the University of Bristol
- Simon Hall (murderer)
- Simon Hall (writer) (born 1969), BBC correspondent and novelist
- Simon J. Hall, urologist
