= Ian Hall =

Ian Hall may refer to:

- Ian Hall (English sportsman) (born 1939), English cricketer and footballer
- Ian Hall (rugby union) (born 1946), Welsh rugby union player
- Ian Hall (musician) (1940–2022), Guyanese-born British musician, composer, organist and educator
- Ian Hall (statistician), British statistician and epidemiologist
