= Cliff Hall =

Cliff or Clifford Hall may refer to:

- Cliff Hall (photographer) (1925–2020), American photographer and designer
- Clifford Hall (singer) (1925–2008), Cuban-born Jamaican musician, member of the English folk music group The Spinners
- Cliff Hall (comedian) (1894–1972), American comedian
- Clifford Hall (cricketer) (1902–1982), English cricketer
- Clifford Hall (painter) (1904–1973), British painter
