= Norman Hall =

Norman Hall may refer to:

- Norman Hall (politician) (1829–1917), member of the U.S. House of Representatives from Pennsylvania
- Norman Hall (Gainesville, Florida), a historic academic building on the eastern campus of the University of Florida
- Norman Hall (scientist), Australian fisheries scientist
- Norman Hall (footballer) (1897–?), English footballer
- Norman B. Hall (1886–1962), first aviation engineering officer in the United States Coast Guard
- Norman J. Hall (1837–1867), officer in the United States Army during the American Civil War
- Norman S. Hall (1895–1964), American screenwriter
- G. Norman Hall (1885–1965), South African veterinary pathologist

== See also ==
- Normans Hall, a Tudor house in Prestbury, Cheshire, England
