= Kate Hall =

Kate Hall may refer to:

- Kate Hall (athlete) (born 1997), American track and field athlete
- Kate Hall (curator) (1861–1918), English museum curator
- Kate Hall (soap opera writer), American writer
- Kate Hall (singer) (born 1983), Danish-English singer

== See also ==
- Katy Hall, American politician
- Katie Hall (disambiguation)
