= Ailsa Hall =

British biologist

Ailsa Jane Hall OBE
- Education: University of Birmingham
- Scientific career
- Workplaces: University of St Andrews
- Thesis: The health of post mortem workers : a morbidity and mortality study (1989)

Ailsa Jane Hall OBE FRSE is a British biologist who is the director of the Sea Mammal Research Unit at the University of St Andrews. Her research considers the impact of contaminants on the risk of mortality in marine mammals.

== Early life and education ==
In 1985, Hall joined the University of Birmingham Institute of Occupational Health. Her early research considered the microbial health risks of post mortem workers. This work, which informed the Code of Practise for the Department of Health and Social Care, formed the basis of her doctoral research.

== Research and career ==
In 1989, Hall joined the Sea Mammal Research Unit. At the time, the Unit was based in Cambridge, and Hall joined as an epidemiologist. She investigated an outbreak of phocine distemper amongst harbour seals. She moved to the University of St Andrews in 1996, where she worked on the immune response of seals. She demonstrated that polychlorinated biphenyl contributed to the mortality of harbour seals in the North Sea. Whilst PCBs were banned in the late 1970s due to toxicity, they continue to be in circulation, and are able to resist extreme heat.

Hall investigates the impact of pathogens and contaminants on the health of marine mammals. She is interested in how contaminants and pathogens impact the early survival of animals. Hall focused her efforts on improving biodiversity in the ocean. She studied the impact of climate change on populations of humpback whales, showing a significant drop in breeding successes in the wild.

Hall was appointed Officer of the Order of the British Empire (OBE) in the 2022 New Year Honours for services to environmental protection and epidemiology. She was elected a Fellow of the Royal Society of Edinburgh in 2024.

== Selected publications ==
- Tero Härkönen; Rune Dietz; Peter Reijnders; et al. (1 January 2006). "The 1988 and 2002 phocine distemper virus epidemics in European harbour seals". Diseases of Aquatic Organisms. 68 (2): 115–130. doi:10.3354/dao068115. ISSN 0177-5103. PMID 16532603. Wikidata Q33236217.
- Gina M Ylitalo; John E Stein; Tom Hom; et al. (1 January 2005). "The role of organochlorines in cancer-associated mortality in California sea lions (Zalophus californianus)". Marine Pollution Bulletin. 50 (1): 30–39. doi:10.1016/j.marpolbul.2004.08.005. ISSN 0025-326X. PMID 15664031. Wikidata Q44635779.
- A. J. Hall; R. J. Law; D. E. Wells; et al. (1 April 1992). "Organochlorine levels in common seals (Phoca vitulina) which were victims and survivors of the 1988 phocine distemper epizootic". Science of the Total Environment. 115 (1–2): 145–162. doi:10.1016/0048-9697(92)90039-u. ISSN 0048-9697. PMID 1594930. Wikidata Q46036848.
