= J. C. Hall =

J. C. Hall may refer to:

- J. C. Hall (author) (born 1964), Chinese-Canadian writer
- J. C. Hall (businessman) (1891–1982), American businessman and founder of Hallmark
- J. C. Hall (poet) (1920–2011), British poet
