= Carl Hall =

Carl Hall may refer to:

- Carl Hall (singer) (1934-1999), African-American singer, actor, and musical arranger
- Carl Hall (mountaineer) (1848–1908), Danish mountaineering pioneer
- Nickie Hall (Carl Nicholas Hall, 1959–2024), American football player
- Carl Christian Hall (1812–1888), Danish statesman
- Carl Austin Hall, murderer of Bobby Greenlease
- Carl Hall (rugby) (born 1969), New Zealand rugby league, and rugby union footballer
