= Jennifer Hall (disambiguation) =

Jennifer Hall (born 1977) is an American actress. Jennifer Hall may also refer to:

- Jennifer Caron Hall (born 1958), English actress, singer and journalist
- Jennifer L. Hall (born 1976), an American federal judge
