= Bruce Hall =

Bruce Hall may refer to:

- Bruce Hall (musician) (born 1953), bass guitarist for REO Speedwagon
- Bruce Hall (photographer), legally blind photographer
- Bruce Hall, vocalist for Agent Steel

== Places ==
- Bruce Hall (Australian National University), a hall of residence at the Australian National University
- Bruce Hall (University of Pittsburgh), a residence hall at the University of Pittsburgh
