= Rebecca Hall (musician) =

American folk singer/songwriter (born 1965)

Rebecca Ruth Hall (born February 22, 1965) is an American folk singer/songwriter.

== Biography ==
Born in Boston, Massachusetts, Hall graduated from Boston Latin School before moving to New York City in 1988, earning a B.A., summa cum laude, in English literature from the City College of the City University of New York. She studied at the CUNY Graduate Center toward a PhD in English literature, but later withdrew. She began writing and performing her own songs in the late 1990s, later forming a duo with her husband, Ken Anderson, who produced her albums Rebecca Hall Sings! and Sunday Afternoon. The couple moved to southern Vermont in 2003.

Hall was awarded runner-up in the 2005 Minnesota Folk Festival New Folk Songwriting Contest. Her song "O Lord" was covered by David Olney, on his 2005 album, Migration. In 2007, Hall and Anderson changed their collective name to Hungrytown to coincide with the release of their first, eponymous, CD.

As Hungrytown, Rebecca Hall and Ken Anderson tour nationally, performing at libraries, coffeehouses and other venues. While touring, they live in the Blue Meanie, a customized Sprinter campervan that is fitted with solar panels on its roof.

== Discography ==
- Rebecca Hall Sings! (2000)
- Sunday Afternoon (2002)
- Hungrytown (2008)
- Any Forgotten Thing (2011)
- Further West (2015)
