= Sea Mammal Research Unit =

Scottish marine science research organisation

- Type: Research institute
- Established: 1978
- Administrative staff: 40 (approx)
- Location: St Andrews, Fife, Scotland
- Affiliations: University of St Andrews,
- Website: www.smru.st-andrews.ac.uk

The Sea Mammal Research Unit (SMRU) is a marine science research organisation in Fife, Scotland. It provides the UK's main science capability in the field of marine mammal biology. It is located at the Gatty Marine Laboratory, part of the University of St Andrews. It was established in 1978, when the Natural Environment Research Council merged its Seals Research Division and Whale Research Unit.

SMRU's current strategic science priorities include evaluating the status of marine mammal populations; investigating the importance of marine mammals as components of marine ecosystems; determining the dynamics of marine mammal populations; studying marine mammal social structure and communication; providing the technological basis for observing free-ranging marine mammals and their environment. SMRU also uses the popularity of marine mammals to improve public knowledge about the marine environment.

SMRU's activities address the requirements for information about marine mammals identified in the UK and Scottish Sustainable Development and Biodiversity Strategies and the Strategy for Scotland’s Coast and Inshore Waters. It is also relevant to the Joint UK Response to the Review of Marine Nature Conservation, the EU Marine Strategy and the UK Small Cetacean Bycatch Response Strategy.

SMRU is an independent NERC collaborative centre. The funding it receives from NERC is mainly to support the Conservation of Seals Act 1970. SMRU focuses over half of its research effort on cetaceans. In agreement with NERC, SMRU raises the remainder of its funding from other sources. These include the European Union, Defra, Scottish Government and UK Ministry of Defence. It also develops and supplies instrumentation to the science community.

SMRU Consulting Ltd (Europe) was set up in 2006 as the commercial arm of the Sea Mammal Research Unit at the University of St Andrews and provides consultancy services and advice on marine environmental issues. They have offices in Europe, North America and Asia-Pacific.

Notable SMRU Consulting projects includes Marine Mammal Mitigation on the world's first commercial tidal device at Strangford Loch and the development of PAMBuoy, now Decimus - run by St Andrews Instrumentation Ltd.

On 1 June 2016, a dead Minke whale washed ashore on the West Sands beach of St Andrews, near to the SMRU, and was discovered by a dog walker that evening. During low-tide on 2 June, staff and students from the SMRU, along with the Scottish Marine Animal Strandings Scheme, jointly conducted a necropsy of the whale in view of the public. Noting signature abrasions on the tailstock, and excessive fluid in the lungs, they concluded that the animal had been caught in a fishing trawler's lines, and was drowned by the dragging.
