= Leonard Hall =

Leonard Hall may refer to:

== People ==
- Leonard Hall (boxer) (born 1907, date of death unknown), Rhodesian and later South African boxer
- Leonard Hall (socialist) (1866–1916), British trade unionist and socialist activist
- Leonard Hall (Florida politician) (born 1943), American politician in the state of Florida
- Leonard Hall (New York politician) (1900–1979), former United States Representative from New York

== Buildings ==
- Leonard Hall (Shaw University), a historic educational building in Raleigh, North Carolina, built in 1881
- Dr. Leonard Hall House, a former residence listed on the National Register of Historic Places
