= Josie Briggs Hall =

American writer and teacher

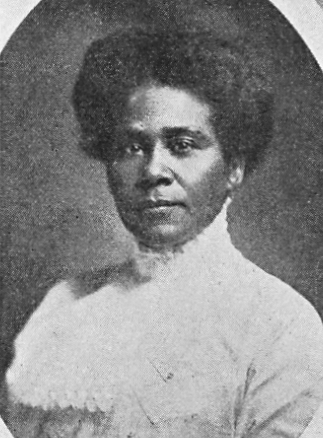
- Born: Josie Briggs; September 17, 1869; Waxahachie, Texas, US
- Died: October 25, 1935 (aged 66); Dallas, Texas, US
- Occupations: writer and teacher
- Spouse: J. P. Hall

Josie Briggs Hall (September 17, 1869 – October 25, 1935) was an American writer and teacher. She wrote the first book published by a black Texan woman.

== Life ==
Josie Briggs was born in Waxahachie, Texas, on September 17, 1869. Her parents, Henry and Tennie Briggs, died when she was 11 years old. Briggs moved in with her sister and attended Bishop College in Marshall, Texas, around 1886 but did not graduate.

At 16, Briggs took her first teaching job in Canaan, Texas. In 1888, she married schoolteacher J. P. Hall. The couple had five children. She also taught in the Texas towns of Ray and Mexia, and in the Mississippi towns of Peyton and Tunica.

Josie Briggs Hall had almost finished her first book when a fire destroyed the manuscript in 1898. Her next book, A Scroll of Facts and Advice (Houx's Printery, 1905), was the first book published by a Texan black woman. She followed it with Hall's Moral and Mental Capsule for the Economic and Domestic Life of the Negro, As a Solution to the Race Problem (R.S. Jenkins, 1905), an anthology of original poems and essays, reprinted material, and "biographical sketches and photographs of leading blacks in Texas and the United States." The book was one of many "self-education manuals similar to textbooks... marketed at African Americans seeking an education outside of a traditional classroom setting." Hall was motivated to write it in part to "counsel the parents" of children like those she taught.

Hall later moved to Dallas and founded the Homemakers' Industrial and Trade School, which she ran from 1916 to 1928.

Hall died on October 25, 1935, in Dallas.

In 1936, Hall's poetry was included in an anthology of black Texan poets, Heralding Down: An Anthology of Verse, edited by J. Mason Brewer.
