= Noel Hall =

Noel Hall may refer to:

- Noel Hall (sport shooter) (1913–2010), Australian soldier and Olympic shooting competitor
- Noel Hall (bishop) (1891–1962), Anglican Bishop in India, 1936–1957
- Noel Frederick Hall (1902–1983), economist and academic
