= Eric Hall (disambiguation) =

Eric Hall (1938–2020) was a British football agent.

Eric Hall may also refer to:

- Eric Hall (athlete) (1932–2022), Olympic racewalker
- Ross Hall (politician) (Eric Ross Hall, 1925–1999), Canadian politician
- Eric G. Hall (1922–1998), Pakistani general

== See also ==
- Rick Hall, American record producer, songwriter, and musician
