= Derrick Hall (disambiguation) =

Derrick Hall (born 1969) is an American sports executive.

Derrick Hall may also refer to:

- Derrick Hall (cricketer) (1892–1947), Irish cricketer
- Derrick Hall (politician), American politician

== See also ==
- Derick Hall (born 2001), American professional football linebacker
- Darick Hall (born 1995), American professional baseball first baseman
