= Arch Hall =

Arch Hall may refer to:

- Arch Hall (horse), a Canadian thoroughbred racehorse
- Arch Hall Sr. (1908–1978), American actor, writer, and film producer
- Arch Hall Jr. (born 1943), American actor, musician, airline pilot, and author
- Archibald Hall (1924–2002), British murderer and thief
