= Ruth Hall =

Ruth Hall may refer to:

- Ruth Hall (novel), an 1854 roman à clef by Fanny Fern (pen name of Sara Payson Willis)
- Ruth Hall (actress) (1910–2003), American actress
- Ruth Hall (academic) (born 1973), South African political scientist
- Ruth Hall (activist), British campaigner against rape
- Ruth Hall (scientist) (born 1945), Australian microbiologist
