= Roger Hall =

Roger Hall may refer to:

- Roger Hall (playwright) (born 1939), New Zealand playwright
- Roger Hall (artist) (1914–2006), British artist
- Roger Lee Hall (born 1942), American composer and musicologist
- Roger Wolcott Hall (1919–2008), American Army officer and spy
- Roger Evans Hall (1888–1969), British barrister and colonial judge
