= Al Hall =

Al Hall may refer to:

- Al Hall (baseball) (died 1885), 19th-century baseball player
- Al Hall (musician) (1915–1988), American jazz bassist
- Nickname for Albert Hall:
  - Al Hall (hammer thrower) (1934-2008), American hammer thrower
