= Eve Hall =

- Born: Eve Steinhardt; 20 March 1937
- Died: 23 October 2007
- Education: M.A.
- Known for: Gypsy journalist, ANC activist, and a development worker
- Spouse: Tony Hall
- Children: Philip, Andrew, Christopher

Eve Hall (née Steinhardt; 20 March 1937 – 23 October 2007) was a French-born South African anti-apartheid activist, gypsy journalist, and development worker. She lived at Matumi, Nelspruit, South Africa, with her husband, Tony Hall.

== Early life ==
Eve Steinhardt was born in Paris to an Austrian Jewish father and a German mother. WWII broke out while her father was visiting South Africa. Her mother, Elise, refused to pin the yellow star on her half-Jewish daughter's clothes. Eve's paternal aunt and grandmother were both murdered during the Holocaust, the latter died in Treblinka. She and her mother went to reunite with Eve's father in South Africa after the war. She attended Witwatersrand University and Reading University, where she became an M.A. graduate. Eve and Tony Hall met at Witwatersrand University and together became gypsy journalists and development workers. The couple married and had three sons Philip, Andy, and Christopher.

In 1964, Eve and Tony Hall and their three sons were banned from returning to South Africa as listed members of proscribed organizations.

== Career ==
Hall was the women's editor of the Daily Nation, one of the most significant national daily papers in Kenya. The couple worked in places such as London, Oxford, Nairobi, Delhi, and a few more. She was Oxfam's information officer in Delhi, India and launched the ANC women section at Dar es Salaam, Tanzania. Hall was a Chief Technical Officer of the ILO (International Labour Organization) in Somalia and helped in solving issues related to gender inequalities. Hall returned to South Africa in 1991 when apartheid ended.

== Death ==
Eve Hall died of breast cancer in 2007 in Matumi, Nelspruit, South Africa, aged 70. Her widower died in 2008.
