= Isaac Walker Hall =

British pathologist and writer

- Born: 1868
- Died: 9 October 1953 (aged 84–85); Godalming
- Occupation(s): Pathologist, writer

Isaac Walker Hall (1868 – 9 October 1953) was a British pathologist and writer.

Walker Hall was educated at Owens College, Manchester. He obtained his M.B. with honours at Victoria University in 1899 and his M.D. in 1902. He studied pathology in Leipzig, Stockholm and Wiesbaden. In 1900, he was appointed senior demonstrator of physiology and lecturer in pathology at Victoria University.

In 1905, he co-authored Methods of Morbid Histology and Clinical Pathology, with Gotthold Herxheimer. Hall was appointed first honorary pathologist and bacteriologist to the Bristol Royal Infirmary and first professor of pathology at University College, Bristol in 1906.

Walker Hall authored important papers on typhoid fever in 1908 and contributed literature on the bacteriology of public health. He was a member of the British Medical Association for fifty-five years and was vice-president for its Section of Pathology at the Annual Meeting at Belfast in 1909 and at Liverpool in 1912. He was an honorary member of the Association of Clinical Pathologists.

His The Purin Bodies Of Food Stuffs was positively reviewed in The British Medical Journal.

He retired in 1936 and moved to Godalming with his wife.

== Selected publications ==
- The Clinical Estimation Of Urinary Purins By Means Of The Purinometer (1902)
- The Purin Bodies of Food Stuffs and the Role of Uric Acid in Health and Disease (1904)
- Methods of Morbid Histology and Clinical Pathology (with Gotthold Herxheimer, 1905)
- Clinical Estimations of Purin Bodies in Gouty Urines, Etc (1906)
