= Simon J. Hall =

American urologist

- Education: Columbia University
- Known for: cancer research, minimally invasive surgery
- Scientific career
- Fields: urology

Simon J. Hall is an American researcher who is the Associate Professor and Kyung Hyun Kim, M.D. Chair of Urology and Assistant Professor, Department of Gene and Cell Medicine at The Mount Sinai School of Medicine, as well as the Director of the Barbara and Maurice Deane Prostate Health and Research Center at The Mount Sinai Medical Center, both in New York City.

Hall is the author of four book chapters and more than 30 peer-reviewed articles. He has received fourteen grants and was listed among New York Magazine’s Best Doctors in 2007, 2008 and 2009.

== Biography ==
Hall received his B.A. in biology in 1983 from Columbia College, Columbia University and his M.D. in 1988 from the Columbia University College of Physicians and Surgeons. His postdoctoral training included an internship and a junior residency in the department of surgery at The Mount Sinai School of Medicine. He was Chief Resident in the Department of Urology at Boston Medical Center and completed a fellowship in uro-oncology at Baylor College of Medicine.

From 1997 until 2001 Hall was the director of the Department of Urology at Elmhurst Hospital in Queens. In 2001, he was named director of the Barbara and Maurice Deane Prostate Health and Research Center at The Mount Sinai Medical Center, and in 2003 he was named Chair of Mount Sinai's Department of Urology. In 2009, he was named the Kyung Hyun Kim, M.D. Chair in Urology.

Hall's area of research is primarily urologic oncology including the diagnosis, evaluation and treatment of prostate cancer, renal cell cancer and urothelial (transitional cell) cancer affecting the kidneys and bladder, with special focus on the use of robotics and the development of minimally invasive treatment options.

== Awards ==
- 1993: Golden Filiform Award, Dept. of Urology, Boston University Medical Center
- 1996: F. Brantly Scott Award, Scott Dept. of Urology, Baylor College of Medicine
- 1997: AUA/CaPCURE Award, 2nd Place, Pfizer Scholars in Urology Award
- 1999: Edwin Beer Award in Urology, New York Academy of Medicine
- 2001: Dr. Solomon Silver Award in Clinical Medicine, Mount Sinai School of Medicine

== Clinical trials ==
- Autologous PAP-loaded dendritic cell vaccine (APC8015, Provenge) in patients with non-metastatic prostate cancer who experience PSA failure after radical prostatectomy. Sponsor: Denedron Corp, GCO#01-0592.
- Autologous PAP-loaded dendritic cell vaccine (APC8015, Provenge) in patients with hormone refractory disease. Sponsor: Dendreon Corp.
- A Randomized, Multicenter, Single Blind Study in Men with Metastatic Androgen Independent Prostate Cancer to Evaluate Sipuleucel-T Manufactured with Different Concentrations of PA2024 Antigen (P07-2) Sponsor: Dendreon Corp, GCO #08-0813.

== Book chapters ==
Partial list:

- Thompson, TC, Timme, TL, Hall, SJ, and Stapleton, AMF. Perspectives on the Molecular Biology of Prostate Cancer, In Vogelzang, NJ, Scardino, PT, Shipley, WU, and Coffey, DS. (Eds.) Comprehensive Textbook of Genitourinary Oncology, Williams & Wilkins, Baltimore, MD, 1996. ISBN 0-7817-4984-0.
- Hall SJ, Kresina TF, Trauger R, and. Conley BA. Gene Therapy for the Treatment of Cancer, In Kresina TF (Ed.), An Introduction to Molecular Medicine and Gene Therapy, John Wiley & Sons, New York, NY. 2001. ISBN 978-0-471-39188-3.
- Millikan RE and Hall SJ. New Possibilities in Systemic Treatment for Metastatic Bladder Cancer, In Droller MJ (Ed.), Bladder Cancer: Current Diagnosis and Treatment, Humana Press, Totowa, NJ. p. 393-422, 2001. ISBN 0-89603-818-1.

== Publications ==
Partial list:

- Stock, RG; Cesaretti, JA; Hall, SJ; Stone, NN (December 2009). "Outcomes for patients with high-grade prostate cancer treated with a combination of brachytherapy, external beam radiotherapy and hormonal therapy". BJU Int. 104 (11): 1631–6. doi:10.1111/j.1464-410X.2009.08661.x. PMID 19493260. S2CID 28804721.
- Narla, G; DiFeo, A; Fernandez, Y; et al. (August 2008). "KLF6-SV1 overexpression accelerates human and mouse prostate cancer progression and metastasis". J. Clin. Invest. 118 (8): 2711–21. doi:10.1172/JCI34780. PMC 2441856. PMID 18596922.
- Ip, C; Hall, SJ (June 2007). "Hormonal implications in the development and treatment of prostate cancer". Endocrinol. Metab. Clin. North Am. 36 (2): 421–34. doi:10.1016/j.ecl.2007.03.009. PMID 17543727.
- Stanizzi, MA; Hall, SJ (2007). "Clinical experience with gene therapy for the treatment of prostate cancer". Rev Urol. 9 (Suppl 1): S20–8. PMC 1831538. PMID 17387369.
- Jandorf, L; Chang, MS; Smith, K; Florio, A; Hall, SJ (2007). "Community-based free prostate cancer screening program". Prog Community Health Partnersh. 1 (3): 215–20. doi:10.1353/cpr.2007.0024. PMC 2614324. PMID 19129926.
- Schnur, JB; DiLorenzo, TA; Montgomery, GH; et al. (2006). "Perceived risk and worry about prostate cancer: a proposed conceptual model". Behav Med. 32 (3): 89–96. doi:10.3200/BMED.32.3.89-96. PMC 2258456. PMID 17120384.
- Gade, TP; Hassen, W; Santos, E; et al. (October 2005). "Targeted elimination of prostate cancer by genetically directed human T lymphocytes" (PDF). Cancer Res. 65 (19): 9080–8. doi:10.1158/0008-5472.CAN-05-0436. PMID 16204083.
- Selleck, WA; Canfield, SE; Hassen, WA; et al. (February 2003). "IFN-gamma sensitization of prostate cancer cells to Fas-mediated death: a gene therapy approach". Mol. Ther. 7 (2): 185–92. doi:10.1016/s1525-0016(02)00040-0. PMID 12597906.
- Cardozo, CP; Michaud, C; Ost, MC; et al. (February 2003). "C-terminal Hsp-interacting protein slows androgen receptor synthesis and reduces its rate of degradation". Arch. Biochem. Biophys. 410 (1): 134–40. doi:10.1016/s0003-9861(02)00680-x. PMID 12559985.
