= Cyril Hall =

Australian rules footballer

Personal information
- Full name: Cyril Hall
- Born: 14 December 1889
- Died: 20 March 1979 (aged 89)

Playing career^{1}
Years	Club	Games (Goals)
1919	Melbourne	9 (0)
- ^{1} Playing statistics correct to the end of 1919.

Cyril Hall (14 December 1889 – 20 March 1979) was an Australian rules footballer who played with Melbourne in the Victorian Football League (VFL).
