= Kevin Hall =

Kevin Hall could refer to:

- Kevin Hall (footballer) (born 1944), Australian footballer
- Kevin Peter Hall (1955–1991), American actor
- Kevin Hall (sailor), American Olympic athlete
