= Stanley Hall (disambiguation) =

G. Stanley Hall was a psychologist and educator.

Stanley Hall may also refer to:

- Stanley Hall (dancer) (1917–1994), British-born ballet dancer
- Stanley Hall (politician) (1888–1962), Canadian politician
- Stanley Hall (coach) (1914–1990), American football and basketball coach
- Stanley Hall, Shropshire, seat of the Tyrwhitt baronets
- Stanley Hall, Clayfield, a house in Brisbane, Queensland, Australia
- Stan Hall (1917–1999), English footballer

== See also ==
- Stanley Halls, South Norwood
