= Naomi Hall =

American musician

Naomi Hall is an American musician. She gained fame in the outsider music community after her music was featured on the Incorrect Music Show. After her introduction on that show, Hall was asked to cover another outsider artist's work, B.J. Snowden's 'In Canada' and would record its introductory theme. Hall currently lives in Seattle, Washington and continues to record and perform her music.

== Music ==
Naomi Hall's work has been categorized in the past as an outside musician, a label that she gladly accepts. Outsider music, like outsider art is separated from its mainstream counterparts by its obscurity, "incorrectness", and often the outcast status of the artists who produce it. When asked in an interview about her reaction to being featured alongside other outsider artists on the Incorrect Music Show, Hall stated:

At first, I was offended and didn't understand how my music could be played alongside some of the other songs. Given, I was only 16 or so and hadn't heard anything besides country, rock, and pop. Then I listened to Leonard Nimoy's "Ballad of Bilbo Baggins" and William Shatner's "Tambourine Man." ...Then I finally understood. And I smiled. Now I happily accept.

Hall's music came to the attention of the Incorrect Music Show after she posted it on mp3.com; at the time she was featured on the site she was 16 years old and produced all of her music in her bedroom. Her earlier songs consisted of her voice, guitar, bass guitar, drums, synthesizer and piano; later Hall would incorporate electronic elements into her compositions. Her lyrics are somewhat unusual treatments of commonplace subjects such as misbehaving dogs ("There's something about Ishka"), stalking a boy and harming his cat ("This breath breathed"), and sexual passion ("Until I drown").

Currently Hall performs with a group, doing live shows consisting of her original work and covers of popular tunes. Her later songs are more polished than her earlier entries and display what could be called either a better command of her instruments or a growing appreciation (but not complete adoption) of musical conventions. .

== Biography ==
Hall moved from Florida to Seattle, Washington in 2005 to work on her music.
