= Jessica Hall =

Jessica Hall may refer to:

- Jessica Hall (American actress) (born 1983)
- Jessica Hall (British actress) (born 1981)
- Jessica Hall (rower) (born 1992), Australian rower
