= Leanne Hall =

Leanne Hall may refer to:

- Leanne Hall (author), Australian author
- Leanne Hall (footballer) (born 1980), English football goalkeeper

== See also ==
- Lianne Hall
