= General Hall =

General Hall may refer to:

- Charles P. Hall (1886–1953), U.S. Army lieutenant general
- Elmer E. Hall (1890–1958), U.S. Marine Corps brigadier general
- Gage John Hall (c.1775–1854), British Army general
- Herman Hall (1864–1928), U.S. Army brigadier general
- James R. Hall (born 1936), U.S. Army lieutenant general
- Jonathan Hall (British Army officer) (born 1944), British Army major general
- Julian Hall (1837–1911), British Army lieutenant general
- William Evens Hall (1907–1984), U.S. Air Force lieutenant general
- William Preble Hall (1848–1927), U.S. Army brigadier general

== See also ==
- General Hall, an imprint of publishing company Rowman & Littlefield
- Attorney General Hall (disambiguation)
