= Aaron Hall =

Aaron Hall may refer to:

- Aaron Hall (American football) (born 2003), American football defensive tackle
- Aaron Hall (footballer) (born 1990), Australian rules footballer
- Aaron Hall (rugby union) (born 1998), Irish rugby union player
- Aaron Hall (singer) (born 1964), American R&B singer and songwriter
- Aaron Davis Hall, a performing arts center in Harlem
