= Cecelia Hall =

Cecelia Hall or Cecilia Hall may refer to:

- Cecelia Hall (mezzo-soprano), American opera singer
- Cecelia Hall (sound editor), American sound editor
- Cecilia Häll, Swedish actress
