= Ivan P. Hall =

American historian (1932–2023)

- Born: May, 1932; Bulgaria
- Died: February 1, 2023 (aged 90–91); Hoenow, East Berlin, Germany
- Occupations: Historian and former diplomat
- Known for: Cartels of the Mind: Japan's Intellectual Closed Shop

Ivan P. Hall (May 1932 – February 1, 2023) was an American historian specialized in Japan's history, and a former diplomat who came to prominence with the publication of his 1997 book Cartels of the Mind: Japan's Intellectual Closed Shop. The book was named one of the ten best business books of 1997 by Business Week magazine. It argued that thanks to a variety of extralegal practices foreigners are largely excluded from intellectual life in Japan.

He went on in 2002 to publish Bamboozled: How America Loses the Intellectual Game with Japan and its Implications for Our Future in Asia, which Foreign Affairs suggested was “destined to arouse passions ....among Japanese nationalists and American liberals”.

== Biography ==
Hall was born to American missionary parents in Bulgaria in 1932. He studied European history as an undergraduate at Princeton before obtaining a doctorate in Japanese history from Harvard in 1969. He has served as a Japan representative of Japan-U.S. Friendship Commission and has been a visiting professor at Japanese universities. He is a former resident of Chiang Mai, Thailand.

== Death ==
Hall died in Hoenow, former East Berlin, Germany, on February 1, 2023, at the age of 91.
