= Lewis Hall =

Lewis Hall may refer to:

== People ==
- Lewis Hall (politician) (1860–1933), English-born dental surgeon and politician
- Lewis Hall (soldier) (1895–1943), United States Army soldier
- Lewis Hall (footballer) (born 2004), English association footballer
- Lewis Hall (high jumper), winner of the 1953 NCAA DI outdoor high jump championship

== Places ==
- Lewis Hall (Notre Dame), one of the residence halls at the University of Notre Dame
