= Phil Hall =

Phil Hall may refer to:

- Phil Hall (journalist) (born 1955), British newspaper editor and PR consultant
- Phil Hall (poet) (born 1953), Canadian poet
- Phil Hall (US writer) (born 1964), American writer
- Phil Hall (author) (born 1962), British editor of comics
- Philip Hall (1904–1982), English mathematician
- Philip Hall, an eponymous fictional character in the Bette Green novel Philip Hall Likes Me, I Reckon Maybe
- Philip Baker Hall (1931–2022), American actor
- Philip Hall (diplomat) (born 1967), British diplomat
