= Luke Hall =

Luke Hall may refer to:

- Luke Hall (politician) (born 1986), British Conservative Member of Parliament
- Luke Hall (swimmer) (born 1989), Swazi swimmer
- Luke Edward Hall (born 1989), British designer
