= Louise Hall =

Louise Hall may refer to:

- Louise Hall (academic) (1905–1990), professor of art and architecture at Duke University
- Louise Hall (suffragist) (1881–1966), American suffragist
- Louise Hall Tharp (1898–1992), American biographer

== See also ==
- Lois Hall, American actress
