= Shadrach A. Hall =

American politician (1835–1915)

Shadrach Azariah Hall (July 15, 1835 – February 7, 1915) was an American farmer, educator, and politician.

Hall was born in Jefferson County, New York and went to the New York public schools. He moved with his parents to Wisconsin in 1845 and received his bachelor's degree from University of Wisconsin–Madison in 1861. Hall served in the 5th Wisconsin Infantry Regiment during the American Civil War. In 1869, Hall moved to Yellow Medicine County, Minnesota. He served on the Yellow Medicine County Commission and was the Yellow Medicine County Superintendent of Schools. Hall served in the Minnesota Senate in 1877 and 1878 and was a Republican. Hall moved to Redwood Falls, Minnesota in 1907. He died in Granite Falls, Minnesota and was buried in Wood Lake, Minnesota.
