= Jason Hall =

Jason Hall may refer to:

- Jason Hall (writer), American comic book writer
- Jace Hall (born 1971), American film, television, and video game producer
- Jason Hall (screenwriter) (born 1972), American screenwriter and former actor
- Jason Hall (physician) (born 1974), American physician and gastroenterologist
- Jason Hall (playwright) (born 1978), Canadian playwright
