= Florence Hall =

Florence Hall may refer to:

- Florence Howe Hall (1845–1922), American author
- Florence Hall (WLA), leader of Woman's Land Army of America
- Florence Hall (actress) (born 1987)
