= Adrian Hall =

Adrian Hall may refer to:

- Adrian Hall (actor) (born 1959), English actor
- Adrian Hall (artist) (born 1943), English artist
- Adrian Hall (director) (1927–2023), American theater director
- Adrian Hall (Home and Away), a fictional character from the soap opera Home and Away
