= Tim Hall =

Tim Hall may refer to:

- Tim Lee Hall (1925–2008), U.S. Representative from Illinois
- Tim Hall (footballer) (born 1997), Luxembourgian association football player
- Tim Hall (American football) (1974–1998), National Football League player
- Tim Hall (coach), American track and field coach for South Carolina Gamecocks women's track and field and men's track and field
- Tim Hall (Kentucky politician), member of the Kentucky House of Representatives
- Tim Hall (Nebraska politician) (born 1956), member of the Nebraska State Senate
