= Ernest Hall =

Ernest Hall may refer to:

- Ernest Hall (judge) (1844–1920), English-born lawyer and judge from New York
- Ernest Hall (cricketer) (1851–1936), English cricketer
- Ernest Hall (businessman) (1930–2024), English businessman and pianist
- Ernest Hall (footballer) (1916–1944), footballer for Brighton & Hove Albion, Newcastle United and Stoke City
- Ernest Hall (British Columbia politician) (1929–1987), English-born merchant and political figure in British Columbia
- Ernest Hall (Arizona politician) (1880–1959), member of the Arizona State Senate
- Ernest Lenard Hall (born 1940), professor of mechanical engineering and computer science
- Ernest Thomas Hall, Australian public servant

== See also ==
- Trevor Hall (rugby league) (Ernest Trevor Hall, 1905–1961), New Zealand rugby league footballer and coach
