= Tanner Hall =

Tanner Hall may refer to:

- Tanner Hall (film), a 2009 drama film
- Tanner Hall (skier) (born 1983), American freeskier
- Tanner Hall (baseball) (born 2002), American college baseball pitcher
