= Patricia Hall =

Patricia Hall may refer to:

- Patricia Hall (athlete) (born 1982), Jamaican sprinter
- Patricia Hall (novelist) (1940–2024), pseudonym used by journalist Maureen O'Connor
- Pat Hall (1917–2010), British ornithologist
- Sister Pat Hall, American backing singer on the 1974 T.Rex album Zinc Alloy and the Hidden Riders of Tomorrow
