= Max Hall =

Max Hall may refer to:

- Max Hall (American football) (born 1985), American football player
- Max Hall (Australian footballer) (born 2002), Australian rules footballer
- Max Hall (cricketer) (born 1975), English cricketer
- Max Hall (racing driver) (born 2007), British racing driver
