= Walter Hall =

Walter Hall may refer to:

- Walter Hall (golfer) (born 1947), American golfer
- Walter Allan Hall (1867–1944), Canadian politician
- Walter Hall (British politician) (1891–1980), soldier and British member of parliament
- Walter Merrill Hall (1887–1980), American tennis player
- Walter Phelps Hall (1884–1962), Dodge Professor of History at Princeton University
- Walter Russell Hall (1831–1911), Australian businessman and donor to medical research
- Walter Hall (cricketer) (1861–1924), English cricketer
- Walter Hall (American politician) (born 1963), member of the West Virginia House of Delegates

== See also ==
- Walter Halls (1871–1953), British trade unionist and politician
