= Victor Hall =

Victor Hall may refer to:

- Victor Hall (footballer) (1886–1966), English footballer
- Victor E. Hall (1901–1981), Canadian physiologist
- Victor W. Hall, American admiral
- Victor Hall (American football) (born 1968), American football player
- Vic Hall (novelist) (Victor Charles Hall, 1896–1972), Australian novelist and biographer
- Victor Hall, Australian author and cult leader

== See also ==
- Thomas Victor Hall (1879–1965), American illustrator, painter and sculptor
- Vic Hall (Vicqual Renee Hall, born 1986), American football player
