= Julian Hall =

Julian Hall may refer to:

- Julian Hall (British Army officer) (1837–1911), British Army officer
- Julian Hall (soccer) (born 2008), American soccer player

== See also ==
- Julian Halls (born 1967), British field hockey player
