= Edmund Hall (priest) =

Edmund Hall (1620?–1687) was an English priest of presbyterian and royalist views, an opponent of Oliver Cromwell who was imprisoned for his attacks.

== Life ==
He was born at Worcester about 1620, a younger son of Richard Hall, clothier, of Worcester, by his wife, Elizabeth (Bonner), and was apparently educated at the King's School, Worcester; Thomas Hall was his eldest brother. In 1636 he entered Pembroke College, Oxford, but left the university without a degree to take up arms for the parliament against Charles I. He took the Solemn League and Covenant, and became a captain in the parliamentary army.

About 1647 he returned to Oxford, and was made a fellow of Pembroke College, proceeding Master of Arts (Oxford) (MA Oxon) on 11 March 1650. He was strongly in favour of monarchy, and wrote bitterly against Cromwell's pretensions with. About 1651 he was committed to prison by the council of state, and remained there for twelve months, still attacking the government in pamphlets. Subsequently he preached in Oxford and the neighbourhood, and about 1657 became chaplain to Edmund Bray, of Great Rissington, Gloucestershire. Bray was a royalist, and tried unsuccessfully to present Hall to the rectory of Great Rissington, of which he was patron.

His views, although Calvinistic, grew into something like conformity with the Church of England, and at the Restoration he made professions of loyalty. In May 1661 he petitioned the government to remove Lewis Atterbury from the rectory of Great Rissington, to which Bray had presented him, without effect. He secured, however, preferment at Chipping Norton, Oxfordshire, where he was generally popular and taken serious by some but not all. In 1680 he finally became rector of Great Rissington on the presentation of Bray. He died in August 1687, and was buried (5 August) in the chancel of his church. On moving to Great Rissington he had married.

== Works ==
Hall was author of 'Ἡ αποστασία ὁ αντίχριστος, ... A scriptural Discourse of the Apostacy and the Antichrist, by E. H.,' London, 1653, dedicated to 'the Right Reverend and Profound Prophetick Textmen of England,' by 'An obedient Son and Servant of the Church and State of England;' and of 'A Funeral Sermon on Lady Anne Harcourt,' Oxford, 1664. According to Anthony Wood, he was the anonymous author of 'Lazarus's Sores lick'd' (London, 1650), an attack on Lazarus Seaman, who had recommended submission to Cromwell and the army. Two anonymous pamphlets, entitled respectively 'Lingua Testium, wherein Monarchy is proved to be Jure Divino,' &c. (Lond. July 1651), and 'Manus Testium Movens, or a presbyteriall glosse upon . . . prophetick Texts . . . which point at the great day of the Witnesses rising,' &c. (London, July 1651), are also attributed to Hall by Wood. Both are severe on the 'present usurpers in England,' who are denounced as 'anti-Christian.' The author on the title-pages is 'Testis-Mundus Catholicus Scotanglo-Britanicus.'
