= Kenneth Hall =

Kenneth Hall (or Ken Hall) may refer to:

- Ken Hall (American football) (1935–2025), American high school football player from Sugar Land, Texas
- Ken G. Hall (1901–1994), Australian film director
- Kenneth O. Hall (born 1941), governor-general of Jamaica
- Kenneth R. Hall (born 1939), American chemical engineer
- Kenneth Keller Hall (1918–1999), U.S. federal judge
- Ken Hall (Australian footballer) (born 1980), Australian rules football player
- Kenneth Hall (artist) (1913–1946), British artist
- Kenneth Hall (Illinois politician) (1915–1995), American politician
- Kenny Hall (priest) (born 1959), dean of Clogher
- Kenny Hall (basketball) (born 1990), American basketball player
- Kenny Hall (musician) (1923–2013), American folk musician
