= Howard Hall =

Howard Hall may refer to:

- Howard Hall (actor) (1867–1921), American actor and writer
- Howard Hall (racing driver) (1885–?), American racecar driver
- Howard Tracy Hall (1919–2008), American physical chemist
- Howard L. Hall (1918–1996), member of the Cumberland County Board of Education, namesake of Howard Hall Elementary School
- Howard Hall (University of Notre Dame), a residence hall at the University of Notre Dame
