= Alfred Hall =

Alfred or Alf Hall may refer to:

- Alfred Hall (footballer), footballer for Burslem Port Vale in 1906
- Alfred A. Hall (1848–1912), Vermont attorney, politician and judge
- Alfred Daniel Hall (1864–1942), British agriculturalist
- Alfred Rupert Hall (1920–2009), British historian of science
- Alf Hall (1896–1964), South African cricketer
- Tubby Hall (Alfred Hall, 1895–1945), jazz drummer
