= Elizeus Hall =

Prophet and messiah claimant (1502–1565)

- Born: 1502; Manchester, England
- Died: 1565 (aged 62–63); Bridewell Prison, London, England
- Occupation: Religious prophet

Elizeus Hall (1502–1565), was a prophet and messiah claimant who claimed to be a messenger from God. He was born in Manchester, England, in 1502, the son of a carpenter. Described as a pious child, "geven to solitarynes abstinence & prayer", Hall became a successful draper and the junior constable of Manchester in 1557.

While working on his accounts one evening in 1551, Hall heard a voice telling him that "the daye draweth nere", and saw a vision of the Five Wounds of Christ. He dismissed it as a dream until an angel appeared to him the following year when he was seriously ill in bed. The angel told Hall that he was "elect and chosen of God to declare and pronounce unto his people his worde", whereupon Hall found himself lifted from his sickbed and taken on a two-day visit to Heaven and Hell. In about 1557–8 Hall began work on his The Visions of Elizeus Hall in Metre, a collection of all his visions that he wrote while on his knees, along with a shorter work he referred to as "his booke of obedience"; there are no extant copies of either book.

Hall travelled from Manchester to London in 1562, where he proclaimed himself "a mesenger sente from godde to the Quene & to all princes". He was interrogated and examined several times during his stay in London, and was denounced in a sermon given by James Pilkington, the Bishop of Durham. After delivering a warning and admonition from God to Edmund Grindel, the Bishop of London, Hall was examined by Grindel on 12 June 1562. For harbouring "popishe Judgement in religion", failing to receive communion, and for holding Catholic views on purgatory and transubstantiation, Hall was pilloried in Cheapside on 26 June and subsequently incarcerated in Bridewell Prison, where he died in 1565.
