= Laura Hall =

Laura Hall may refer to:

- Laura Hall (musician) (born 1961), American musician
- Laura Hall (politician) (born 1943), Alabama politician
- Laura Hall (speed skater) (born 2003), Canadian speed skater
- Laura Nelson Hall (1876–1936), actress
- Laura Ashley Hall, accomplice in the Murder of Jennifer Cave
