= Willis Hall (disambiguation) =

Willis Hall (1929–2005) was an English playwright.

Willis Hall may also refer to:

- Willis Hall (New York politician) (1801–1868), American politician
- Willis Hall Jr. (1779–1856), American politician

== See also ==
- Willis Hall (Carleton College), a historic building on the campus of Carleton College
