= Rodney Hall =

Rodney Hall may refer to:

- Rodney Hall (writer) (born 1935), Australian writer
- Rodney Hall (South Dakota politician) (born 1928), American politician in the state of South Dakota
- Rodney Bruce Hall (born 1960), American professor of international relations
- Rodney Hall (Mississippi politician) (born 1987), American politician in the state of Mississippi
