= Sonny Hall =

English model and poet

- Born: 10 June 1998 (age 28); London, England
- Modelling information
- Height: 1.83 m (6 ft 0 in)
- Hair colour: Brown
- Eye colour: Blue
- Agencies: Why Not Model Management (Milan); One Management (New York); Kate Moss Agency (London); Currently unsigned.

Sonny Hall (born 10 June 1998) is an English model, artist and poet. Hall released his debut poetry collection, The Blues Comes With Good News, through Hodder & Stoughton in September 2019. He was signed to Kate Moss's modelling agency for a brief time.

== Early life ==
Hall was born in Essex. From ages three to four, he moved between foster homes with his twin brother, Harvey. They were eventually adopted at age four. And then raised in Wandsworth, south west London and Surrey. He did maintain contact with his birth mother. He dropped out of sixth form in 2014.

== Career ==
Hall's career started when he was scouted at a gig in Camden Town circa 2014. In 2015, he modelled in British fashion photographer Nick Knight's fashion film, Yungsters. Hall first began writing in 2017 when he was in rehab in Thailand. He shortly began posting his own poetry on his personal Instagram account. Hall self published and released his debut poetry collection The Blues Comes With Good News, in April 2019 which sold over 1.5 thousand copies with its first edition in just six months. A subsequent second edition was published in September 2019 by British publishing house Hodder & Stoughton. He consequently was hired by British fashion designer Christopher Bailey for one of his Burberry campaigns alongside model Adwoa Aboah. Hall's Instagram also caught the attention of British singer Rita Ora who starred him in her music video for her smash hit single "Let You Love Me". Hall collaborated with friend and film director Jim Longden, where he played the lead role in Longden’s directing debut, To Erase A Cloud. Hall spoke at Trinity College, Cambridge University in March 2023, discussing tradition in poetry, confession and struggling with addiction.

== Personal life ==
Hall has lived between the UK and Europe, where several close creative relationships have influenced his work. Recently, he has expanded his practice to include painting and visual art, maintaining a private life.
