= Ethel Harris Hall =

American educator and activist

Ethel Harris Hall (February 23, 1928 - November 12, 2011) was an educator, education official, Baptist deacon, and community advocate in Alabama. She was the first African American to serve on the Alabama State Education Board and became the organizations vice-president for 10 years and then its vice-president emeritus. She wrote My Journey : A Memoir of the First African American to Preside Over the Alabama Board of Education. The Ethel H Hall Health Professions Building is named for her. The UA School of Social Work holds an annual celebration in her honor.
