= Magnus Hall =

Swedish business executive

Magnus Hall (born 1959) is a Swedish business executive and the former CEO of Vattenfall; he served as the company's CEO between October 2014 and October 2020. Prior to this, he served from 2004-2014 as CEO of Holmen. From 2001-2004 he was CEO of Holmen's paper products division; he began his career with Holmen Paper in 1987, after a two-year stint at Holmens Bruk. He graduated from the Linköping Institute of Technology and Georgetown University (on the Fulbright Scholarship).
