= Lucy Hall =

Lucy Hall may refer to:

- Lucy Hall (triathlete) (born 1992), English triathlete
- Lucy Hall (sport shooter) (born 2003), British Olympic shooter
- Lucy Mabel Hall-Brown (1843–1907), née Hall, American physician and writer
