= Dollie Radler Hall =

American geologist

Dollie Radler Hall (4 June 1897 – 15 May 1995) was one of the first female geologists in Oklahoma. In 1921, she earned her master's degree from the University of Oklahoma in the field of Geology. Dollie was married to Charlie Hall, her childhood sweetheart. Though she faced professional exclusion as one of the only female geologists in her field, she followed through in pursuing Geology as her field of study.

== Career ==
After her graduation, she joined the Amerada Petroleum Corp. as an assistant geologist. In 1927 she became the world's first female to act as chief geologist, where her presence in the company, and field increased. In this position she was responsible for directing operations regarding drilling, land exploration, and leasing. Like many female geologists of the time, Radler Hall faced difficulty as a geology academic and professional as there were few women who were being recognized. Discrimination in the work field due to her gender lead her to resigning as chief geologist in 1930. While working for Amerada Petroleum Corp. she supervised land exploration in the northern United States, before resigning in 1950 and starting a consulting business. Hall played an important role in the Stanolind Deal, showcasing her business abilities and eventually lead to Standard Oil buying a part of Amerada's acreage for $2.5 million. Alongside her career, Radler Hall was an active member in the American Association for the Advancement of Science, as well as the Business and Professional Women's Club. Radler Hall is noted on her works in Cuba in regards to oil, and her publication of "A Look at the Oil Possibilities of Cuba." Hall was also an original founding member creating the Energy Minerals Division for the American Association of Petroleum Geologists.

== Research ==
Hall focused her research in Cuba, looking at the sedimentary rocks and the possible oil within the rocks. Cuba has 3 sedimentary basins that contain several types of igneous rocks. Areas of Cuba that contain Serpentinite, is found to have oil or oil residue. Hall mentions that Serpentinite are found within the Jurassic and Cretaceous layers of rock, and that the stratigraphy of these sediments have evidence of intrusion by other types of igneous rocks. The geology of Cuba, contains three stratigraphic sections: Cretaceous, Jurassic, and Tertiary. The three stratigraphic sections have become complicated structures as they have experienced deformation, unconformities, folds and faulted rock. Accumulated amounts of oil can be found within the complicated structure of beds but finding out where to prospect for oil is one out of many concerns.

== Achievements ==
- Author of Lincoln County Section of the Oklahoma Geological Survey's Bulletin Oil and Gas in Oklahoma
- Member of American Association of Petroleum Geologist
- First woman honoured in Tulsa Geological Society
