= Carol Hall (disambiguation) =

Carol Hall was an American composer and lyricist. Carol Hall could also refer to:

- Carol Hall (politician), 21st century American politician
- Carol K. Hall, 20th-21st century American chemical engineer

== See also ==
- Carroll Hall, a residence hall at the University of Notre Dame, named for American founding father Charles Carroll
