= Wayne Hall =

Wayne Hall may refer to:

- Wayne Hall (footballer) (born 1968), English former footballer
- Wayne Denis Hall (born 1951), Australian academic
- Wayne Hall (ice hockey) (born 1939), ice hockey player in the National Hockey League
- Wayne Hall (rugby union) (born 1958), Welsh rugby union player
