= Barry Hall (disambiguation) =

Barry Hall (born 1977) is an Australian rules footballer.

Barry Hall may also refer to:

- Barry Hall (American football), American football player
- Barry Hall (diplomat) (1921–2013), Australian diplomat

== See also ==
- Barrie Lee Hall Jr. (1949–2011), American trumpeter
