= Elizabeth Hall =

Elizabeth Hall may refer to:

== People ==
- Elizabeth Barnard (1608–1670), née Elizabeth Hall, William Shakespeare's granddaughter
- Lizzie Hall (born 1985), British cross country runner and steeplechaser
- Elizabeth Blodgett Hall (1909–2005), academic administrator
- Elizabeth A. H. Hall, British professor of analytical biotechnology

== Buildings ==
- Elizabeth Hall (New Blaine, Arkansas), a historical building in New Blaine, Arkansas
- Elizabeth Hall, a historic building on the campus of Stetson University in DeLand, Florida
- Queen Elizabeth Hall, a music venue on the South Bank in London, often referred to as the "Elizabeth Hall"
