= Adam Hall (disambiguation) =

Adam Hall (born 1980) is an American ice hockey player.

Adam Hall may also refer to:

- Adam Hall (alpine skier) (born 1987), New Zealand alpine skier
- Adam Hall (badminton) (born 1996), Scottish badminton player
- Adam Hall, pseudonym of Elleston Trevor (1920–1995), British novelist and playwright
- Adam Hall (baseball), Canadian and Bermudian baseball player
