= Basil Hall =

Basil Hall may refer to:

- Basil Hall (Canadian politician) (1912–1990), Canadian politician
- Basil Hall (civil servant) (1918–2011), British civil servant
- Basil Hall (Labour politician) (1865–1942), British politician
- Basil Hall (naval officer) (1788–1844), British naval officer
