= Elijah Hall =

Elijah Hall may refer to:

- Elijah Hall (naval officer), officer in the Continental Navy, namesake of the USS Hall
- Elijah Hall (sprinter), American track and field sprinter
