= Judith Hall =

Judith Hall may refer to:

- Judith Hall (poet), American poet
- Judith Elizabeth Hall, Welsh anaesthetist
- Judith Goslin Hall (born 1939), American and Canadian pediatrician, clinical geneticist and dysmorphologist
