= Deakin Hall =

Deakin Hall may refer to:

- Deakin Hall (politician) (1884–1957)
- Deakin Hall, a residence hall at Monash University, Clayton campus.
