= Paul Hall =

Paul Hall may refer to:

- Paul Hall (labor leader) (1914–1980), American labor leader
- Paul Hall (footballer) (born 1972), Jamaican footballer
- Paul R. Hall (born 1976), a.k.a. Hassan Abujihaad, former sailor in the United States Navy convicted of supporting terrorism
