= Lola Hall =

American broadcast journalist

- Born: October 29, 1933 (age 91); Oklahoma City, Oklahoma
- Other names: "the Channel 9 Weather Girl"
- Education: Oklahoma City University (B.A.)
- Occupation: Broadcast journalist
- Known for: first woman broadcast journalist in the Southwestern United States

Lola Hall is an American broadcast journalist from the U.S. state of Oklahoma known for being the first woman in broadcast television in the Southwestern United States. She was popularly known as "the Channel 9 Weather Girl."

== Early life and education ==
Lola Hall was born on October 29, 1933, to Mel Hall and Lola Duncan in Oklahoma City. She graduated from Classen High School in 1951 before attending the Oklahoma City University and graduating with a bachelor's degree in English.

== Journalism career ==
She was hired by KWTV in Oklahoma City in 1956. She was the first woman in the field of broadcast journalism in the Southwestern United States. She became famous as "the Channel 9 Weather Girl." During her career she also worked at WKY-TV, KOKH-TV, OETA, KOMA, KTOK, and for NBC News in New York City. Hall won Oklahoma City Mayor's Award for Handicapped Television Series in 1976, the Call for Action Award for Consumer Reporting in 1978, the Bill Crawford Memorial Award in 1983, and the Oklahoma Education Association's award for Best TV Reporting in Education in 1986. In 1988 she was inducted into the Oklahoma Journalism Hall of Fame.

== Personal life ==
Hall married B. Carl Gadd and the couple have two children.
