= Nathan Hall =

Nathan Hall may refer to:

- Nathan K. Hall (1810–1874), American politician
- Nathan Hall (football coach) (born 1985), Australian footballer and coach
