= Connor Hall =

Connor Hall may refer to:

== Places ==
- Connor Hall (Santa Fe, New Mexico), listed on the U.S. National Register of Historic Places

== People ==
- Connor Hall (tenor), singer in The Homeland Harmony Quartet
- Connor Hall (ice hockey), drafted by the Pittsburgh Penguins
- Connor Hall (footballer, born 1998), for Chorley
- Connor Hall (footballer, born 1993), for Harrogate Town
- Connor Hall (racing driver), American stock car racing driver
