= Cameron Hall =

Cameron Hall may refer to:

- Cameron Hall (arena), a multi-purpose arena used primarily for basketball in Lexington, Virginia
- Cameron Hall (actor) (1897–1983), British actor
- Cameron Hall (basketball player) (born 1957), Canadian basketball player
- Lester del Rey (1915–1993), American author and editor who sometimes used the pseudonym "Cameron Hall"
