= Caroline Hall =

Caroline Hall may refer to:

- Caroline A. Hall (1838–1918), American activist
- Caroline Breese Hall (1939–2012), American pediatrician
