= Darryl Hall =

Daryl or Darryl Hall may refer to:

- Darryl Hall (bassist) (born 1963), American jazz bassist
- Darryl Hall (gridiron football) (born 1966), American football player
- Daryl Hall (born 1946), American musician and lead vocalist of Hall & Oates
