= Shyima Hall =

Egyptian anti-human trafficking advocate

- Born: September 29, 1989 (age 36); Alexandria, Egypt
- Citizenship: United States
- Known for: advocating against human trafficking
- Notable work: campaigning against human trafficking

Shyima Hall (born September 29, 1989), from South Alexandria, Egypt, is known for advocating against human trafficking by sharing her personal experiences as a child slave. At eight years old, she was sold into slavery by her parents to a rich family in Cairo. Hall was given to the family in order to repay her older sister's debt of about thirty dollars. She worked for Abdel Nasser Eid Youssef and Amal Admed Ewis-Abd El Motelib for two years among other slaves. The family moved to Irvine, California where Hall was forced to live in a small room in the family's garage and do chores for the parents and their five children. A neighbor reported their suspicions to child protective services. In 2002, immigration officers came into her captors' home and took her away. She was put into foster care and lived with three foster families until she was 18. In 2014, she and Lisa Wysocky published Hidden Girl, which detailed her childhood as a slave. She now lives in Banning, California with her boyfriend and four-year-old daughter, campaigning against human trafficking by sharing her story of captivity and rescue.

== Childhood and family ==
=== Alexandria, Egypt ===
Born in Alexandria, Egypt, Hall was the seventh child out of eleven children in total. Her two oldest siblings were female twins. Next in line was Hassan, the first brother in the family. After Hassan was another sister, then two brothers. Hall had four younger siblings. Closest in age was a brother, then her sister and another brother. Last was her baby sister, whom Hall had to help her mother birth. She was sold to Abdel Nasser Youssef Ibrahim and Amal Ahmed Ewis-Abd El Motelib by her parents when she was eight years old. It is said that she was sold to repay a debt owed by Hall's oldest sister, Zahra, one of the twins, who had stolen from the Ibrahim family. While speaking at Sam Houston State University, Hall recalls about her home life in Alexandria, "we were a very poor family, but it was a happy family and I was okay with it."

=== Cairo ===
In describing the family who kidnapped her, Hall says "they were a very, very wealthy family…They had five kids, three girls and two boys, twins. They were very powerful people in Egypt." At their home in Cairo, Hall claims her job was to wash dishes, take care of the twin boys, and take orders from Abdel Nasser Youssef Ibrahim and Amal Ahmed Ewis-Abd El Motelib. She recalls among the five to seven other people who worked in the family's home, she was the only child. Hall remained in Cairo, Egypt for almost a year and a half until the father got into trouble with the Egyptian government and decided to move the family to the United States. Hall says that the Ibrahims approached her parents and explained that because Shyima had not yet finished paying off the family's debt, that she would have to move with them to the United States. She recalls her parents promising her that she would only be in the United States for six or seven months. The Ibrahims would smuggle Hall into the United States. She claims that the family coached her on what to say if anyone questioned her passport at the airport. She remembers the last time she saw her parents was when they saw her off at the airport. She flew with a man she had only met once who pretended to be her father. Hall says that in the airport, security did not notice her at all nor did security question the man who posed as her father.

=== Irvine, California ===
Shyima Hall arrived in the United States in 2000 stayed for a total of two years under the Ibrahims' captivity. At the Ibrahims' new home in Irvine, California, Shyima was the only slave in charge of the family's large home. Abdel Nasser Youssef Ibrahim and Amal Ahmed Ewis-Abd El Motelib kept her in a room in the garage. Hall says that she had nothing more than a blanket, a bed, and a light in her room. According to Hall, her daily routine consisted of waking up at five in the morning, getting the children ready for school and cleaning the house. Hall recalls trying wash her clothes in the washing machine when Amal Ahmed Ewis-Abd El Motelib forbid her from washing her clothes in the same place as the family because, according to the Ibrahims, she was "dirty." Amal Ahmed Ewis-Abd El Motelib even slapped her.

In the two years that she lived with the Ibrahims, Hall spoke to her parents twice on the phone. When approached by strangers in public, the Ibrahim's children were taught to say that Hall was a step sister.

== Rescue ==
On April 9, 2002, upon noticing that Hall never left the house or went to school, a neighbor called Child Protective Services. Three days after the tip, the police came to the Ibrahims' home. Originally without a warrant and therefore unable to enter, they had to leave and return some time later. This was when they first found Hall. Hall was taken into the police's custody. Through years of convincing Hall that police would hurt her, Hall was skeptical to speak to them, but eventually she did.

Hall was placed in a group home in Orange County. A day later, the police called Hall's parents who, Hall claims, said, "How dare you to leave these people's home. These are the people that put a roof on top of your head, cared and treated you as part of the family."

== Trial and restitutions ==
Hall's case lasted from 2001 to 2007. It was decided that Hall not be put on the stand. Hall's oldest sister testified against Hall, via video from Egypt, with the support of the Ibrahims. The Ibrahims pleaded guilty and, after a hearing in which Hall got the chance to speak out against her captors, were sentenced to time in prison. Amal Ahmed Ewis-Abd El Motelib received twenty-two months in prison and was deported to Egypt while Abdel Nasser Youssef Ibrahim received a sentence of three years in prison. The charges brought against the Ibrahims were keeping a child in involuntary servitude and harboring an alien. Part of the Ibrahims' plea deal entailed that they pay Hall $152,000, the wages she should have received for the estimated time that she worked for the Ibrahims.

Hall's case served as the first federal prosecution case of human trafficking in Orange County.

== Foster care ==
Shyima Hall had lived with a total of three foster families. Her first family, whom she stayed with for three years, was Arab and Muslim and would not allow her to speak English. Hall was then transferred to a second family in San Jose. She was adopted by Chuck and Jenny Hall, her third foster family. All of the money that was paid to Hall in restitutions was stolen by her new family who had access to her bank account.

== Activism ==
On January 21, 2014, Hidden Girl was published by Simon and Schuster. The book was co-authored by Shyima Hall and Lisa Wysocky. Hall's book details her life from before her capture up until obtaining citizenship. Hall has done multiple appearances and talks at high schools and colleges across the United States. She has appeared on a panel to bring awareness for human trafficking for the United States Court of Appeals for the Ninth Circuit.

== Current life ==
Shyima is now United States citizen (as of 2011) and currently lives with her boyfriend, daughter Athena, and son in Banning, California.
