= Fiona Hall =

Fiona Hall may refer to:

- Fiona Hall (artist) (born 1953), Australian artist
- Fiona Hall (politician) (born 1955), British member of the European Parliament
