= Sharon J. Hall =

American ecosystem ecologist

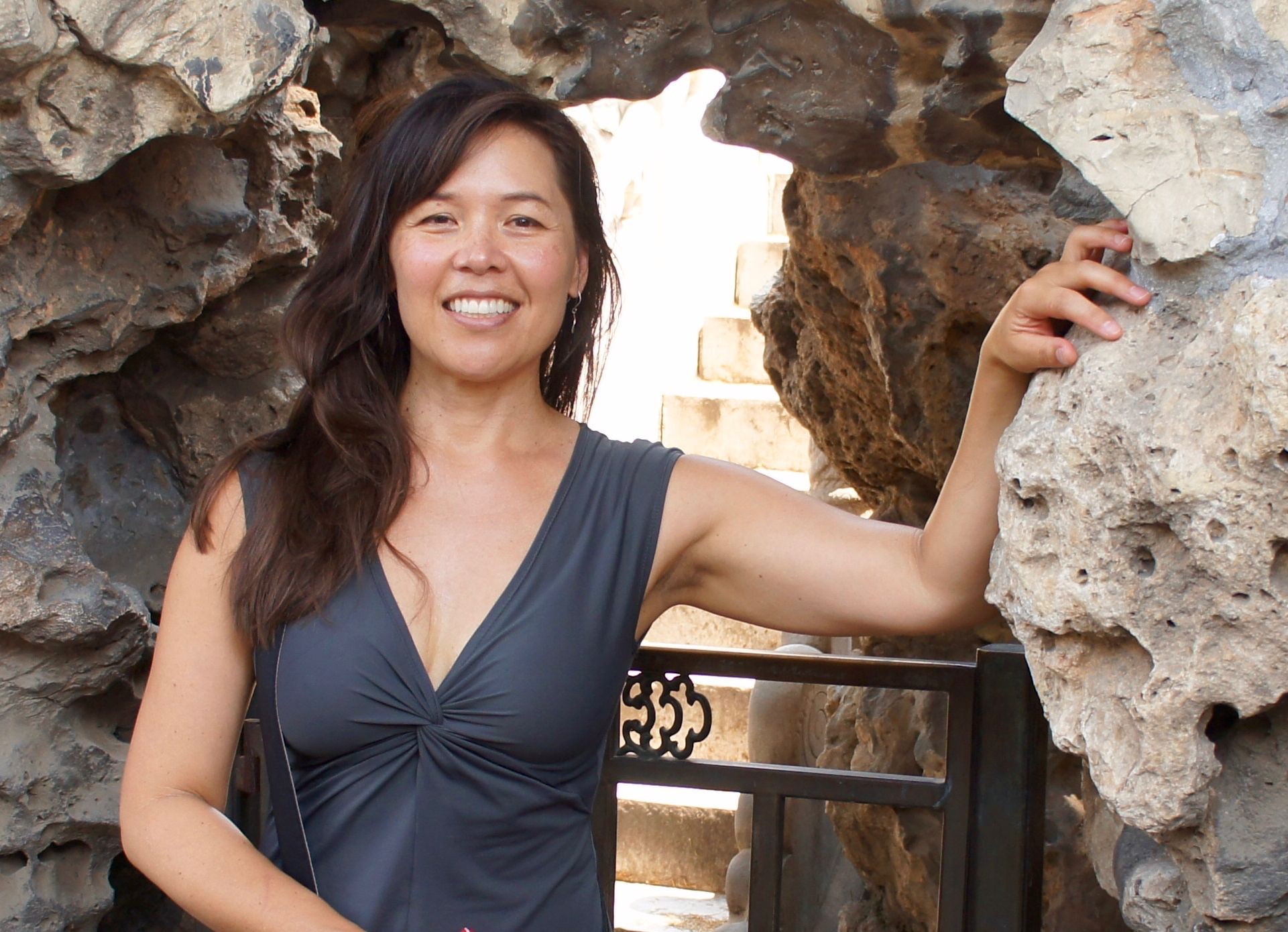
- Born: Oakland, California
- Education: Stanford University Harvard University University of California Berkeley
- Scientific career
- Fields: Ecosystem Ecology
- Workplaces: Arizona State University
- Website: https://halllab.asu.edu

Sharon J. Hall is an ecosystem ecologist and associate professor at the School of Life Sciences at Arizona State University. Her research focuses on ecosystem ecology and the ways in that human activity interacts with the environment.

== Early life and education ==
Sharon Hall was raised in Oakland, California. Her undergraduate education was spent at Stanford University where she received a Bachelor of Science in biological sciences. She then went on to pursue a Master of Education at Harvard University, and a PhD in soil and ecosystem science at the University of California, Berkeley. Not long after receiving her PhD, Hall was an assistant professor in the environmental program at Colorado College, teaching the school's first biogeochemistry course. Currently she is an associate professor at Arizona State University, where she is the director of the Environmental Life Sciences PhD program and the senior sustainability scientist for the Julie Ann Wrigley Global Institute of Sustainability.

== Career and research ==
Sharon Hall and her research team are focused on studying the ways that human activity and ecosystems interact with one another. This includes examining the impact of urban air pollution on ecosystems and studying the implications of different land management practices in urban, residential, and agricultural settings.

Hall worked with Pamela Matson while at Stanford to understand the response of nitrogen trace gas emissions from tropical forests to nitrogen deposition; as well as to publish a comprehensive look at how nitrogen inputs affect terrestrial ecosystems. Hall's research now focuses on the interactions between human activity and arid ecosystems. She has done extensive research with the CAP LTER (Central Arizona-Phoenix Long Term Ecological Research Site, part of the larger LTER network funded by the National Science Foundation) and is on the CAPIV Executive Committee. She has received numerous grants from the National Science Foundation, and from the Andrew W. Mellon Foundation.

== Awards and honors ==
=== Nominations ===
- 2017-18 Zebulon Pearce Distinguished Teaching Award
- 2016 Outstanding Teaching Award, School of Life Sciences
- 2012 Centennial Professorship for excellence in teaching and community service
- 2006 Centennial Professorship

=== Awards and fellowships ===
- 2017 ASU Faculty Teaching Achievement Award
- 2003 John D and Catherine T. MacArthur Professorship for excellence in teaching and scholarship, The Colorado College
- 1998 Gresham Riley Post-Doctoral Fellowship, The Colorado College
- 1996 Earth Systems Science Doctoral Fellow, NASA
- 1994 Graduate Research Fellow, NSF

== Publications ==
Hall has been part of the creation of over 90 publications, several of which have been cited hundreds of times.

- Matson, Pamela, et al. “The Globalization of Nitrogen Deposition: Consequences for Terrestrial Ecosystems.” AMBIO: A Journal of the Human Environment, vol. 31, no. 2, 2002, p. 113
- Hall, Sharon J., and Pamela A. Matson. “Nitrogen Oxide Emissions after Nitrogen Additions in Tropical Forests.” Nature, vol. 400, no. 6740, July 1999, pp. 152–155., doi:10.1038/22094.
- Groffman, Peter M, et al. “Ecological Homogenization of Urban USA.” Frontiers in Ecology and the Environment", vol. 12, no. 1, 1 Feb. 2014, pp. 74–81., doi:10.1890/120374.

== Public engagement ==
Hall is on the science advisory board for the McDowell Sonoran Conservancy Field Institute, where she offers scientific expertise, heads research projects and gets support from volunteers at the institute. She is also part of the governing board for the Ecological Society of America.
