= Parker Hall =

Parker Hall may refer to:

== People ==
- Parker Hall (American football) (1916–2005)

== Buildings ==
- Parker Hall, a dormitory at Bates College, in Lewiston, Maine, named for Thomas Parker
- Parker Masonic Hall, Parker, South Dakota, listed on the U.S. National Register of Historic Places
- Parker Hall, an academic building at Auburn University, in Auburn, Alabama, named for William Vann Parker
