= Janet E. Hall =

Canadian-American neuroendocrinologist

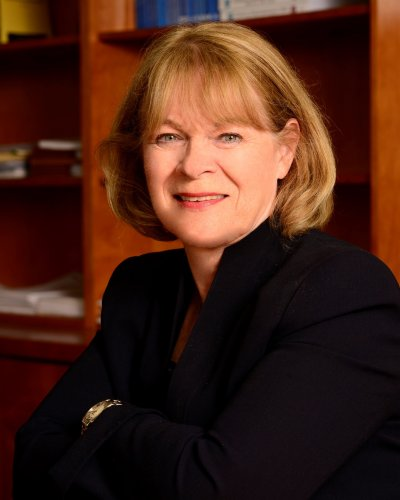
- Citizenship: Canada; United States
- Education: McMaster University Medical School
- Scientific career
- Fields: Neuroendocrinology, women's health, internal medicine
- Workplaces: Massachusetts General Hospital; Harvard Medical School; National Institute of Environmental Health Sciences

Janet Elizabeth Hall is a Canadian-American physician-scientist and neuroendocrinologist specialized in the human reproductive physiology and pathophysiology. Her research focuses on women's health and the neuroendocrine interactions governing normal reproduction and the impact of aging. She is the clinical director at the National Institute of Environmental Health Sciences. Hall was previously a professor of medicine at the Harvard Medical School.

== Life ==
Hall completed a B.A. and B.P.E. (1972), Masters of Medical Sciences (1979) in exercise physiology and a M.D. (1981) at the McMaster University Medical School. She completed a residencies in internal medicine at McMaster University from 1981 to 1984. In 1984, she became a fellow of the Royal College of Physicians and Surgeons of Canada. She completed a clinical and research fellowships at the Massachusetts General Hospital from 1984 to 1987.

Hall became an instructor in medicine at Harvard Medical School in 1987 and later became a full professor of medicine in 2007. She is an elected member of the Association of American Physicians. From 2006 to 2009, she was president of Women in Endocrinology. She was president of the Endocrine Society in 2011. In 2015, she joined National Institute of Environmental Health Sciences (NIEHS) as a senior investigator in the NIH Intramural Research Program. Hall is the clinical director of the National Institute of Environmental Health Sciences (NIEHS) and head of the Reproductive Physiology and Pathophysiology Group and holds a secondary appointment in NIEHS Reproductive and Developmental Biology Laboratory.

Hall specializes in the human reproductive physiology and pathophysiology. Her research focuses on women's health and the neuroendocrine interactions governing normal reproduction and the impact of aging. This includes studying ovarian feedback control of the central components of the reproductive system by gonadal steroids and the inhibin. Hall and her group utilize frequent blood sampling for measurement of LH and gonadotropin free alpha subunit as markers of GnRH secretion and developed and utilized physiologic probes including GnRH, GnRH agonists and antagonists and estradiol, estrogen receptor blockers and aromatase inhibitors, as well as neuroimaging modalities.She has also co-authored research investigating phenotypic variation and non-reproductive features in patients with isolated hypogonadotropic hypogonadism.
