= Sarah Hall =

Sarah Hall may refer to:

- Sarah C. Hall (1832–1926), American physician, suffragist
- Sarah Hall (British politician), Labour MP for Warrington South
- Sarah Hall (glass artist) (born 1951), Canadian stained glass artist
- Sarah Hall (writer) (born 1974), English author
- Sarah Hall (born 1972) British journalist, best known as a novelist under the name Sarah Vaughan (writer)
- Sarah Hall Boardman (1803–1845), American born missionary who spent 20 years in Burma
- Sarah Ladd (1860–1927), née Hall, American pictorial and landscape photographer
- Sarah Ewing Hall (1761–1830), American educator, poet, and essayist of Christian literature
- Sara Hall (born 1983), American distance runner
