= Margaret Hall =

Margaret Hall may refer to:

== Places ==
- Lady Margaret Hall, Oxford, the first women's college in Oxford, named after Lady Margaret Beaufort
- Margaret Addison Hall, part of Victoria University, Toronto

== People ==
- Margaret Bernadine Hall (1863–1910), English painter most notable for her painting Fantine, which hangs in the Walker Art Gallery, Liverpool
- Margaret Hall (designer) OBE, RDI-awarded in 1974 for her exhibitions
- Margaret Hall (photographer), (1876 – 1963)
