= Derek Hall =

Derek Hall may refer to:

- Derek Hall (Australian footballer) (born 1970), Australian rules footballer
- Derek Hall (cricketer) (1932–1983), English cricketer
- Derek Hall (footballer, born 1965), English footballer
- Derek Hall (legal historian) (1924–1975), president of Corpus Christi College, Oxford
