= Glen Hall =

Glen Hall or Glenn Hall may refer to:

- Glen Hall, Indiana, an extinct town
- Glen Hall (cricketer) (1938–1987), South African cricketer
- Glenn Hall (1931–2026), Canadian ice hockey goaltender
- Glenn Hall (rugby league) (born 1981), Australian rugby league player
- Glenn Hall (Georgia Tech), a residence hall at the Georgia Institute of Technology
