= Ray Hall =

Ray Hall may refer to:

- Ray Hall (Australian footballer) (born 1980), Australian rules footballer
- Ray Hall (American football) (born 1971), American football player
- Ray Hall (basketball) (born 1962), American basketball player and coach
- Raymond E. Hall (born 1964), American physicist

== See also ==
- Eugene Raymond Hall, American zoologist
