= Trevor Hall =

Trevor Hall may refer to:

- Trevor Hall (musician) (born 1986), American singer, lyricist and guitarist
- Trevor Hall (album), an album by Trevor Hall
- Trevor Hall (rugby league) (1905–1961), New Zealand landlord, salesman, and professional rugby league footballer
- Trevor Hall (rugby union) (born 1978), South African rugby union player
- Trevor H. Hall (1910-1991), British author, surveyor and skeptic of paranormal phenomena
- Trevor Hall, Denbighshire, country house
