= Clifford Hall (cricketer) =

English cricketer

Personal information
- Full name: Clifford Geoffrey Hall
- Born: 19 January 1902; Breamore, Hampshire, England
- Died: 9 July 1982 (aged 80); Breamore, Hampshire, England
- Batting: Right-handed

Domestic team information
- Years: Team
- 1933–1935: Hampshire

Career statistics
Competition	First-class
Matches	5
Runs scored	77
Batting average	11.00
100s/50s	–/–
Top score	37
Catches/stumpings	1/–
- Source: Cricinfo, 10 January 2010

Clifford Geoffrey Hall (19 January 1902 — 9 July 1982) was an English first-class cricketer.

Hall was born in January 1902 at Breamore, Hampshire. Hall made his debut in first-class cricket for Hampshire against Middlesex at Portsmouth in the 1933 County Championship. His next appearance for Hampshire came in the 1935 County Championship, in which Hall made four appearances. In his five matches for Hampshire, he scored 77 runs at an average of exactly 11, with a highest score of 37. He was later on the ground staff with Wiltshire, but did not feature for the county in minor counties cricket. Hall died at Breamore in July 1982.
