= Gary Hall =

Gary Hall may refer to:

- Gary Hall (academic) (born 1962), professor of media and performing arts
- Gary Hall (judoka) (born 1990), British judoka
- Gary Hall (taekwondo), British taekwondo team performance director
- Gary Hall Sr. (born 1951), American swimmer, Olympian in 1968, 1972 and 1976
- Gary Hall Jr. (born 1974), his son, American swimmer, Olympian in 1996, 2000 and 2004
- Shequida (born Gary Hall), American drag queen, opera singer and actor

== See also ==
- Gary Hill (disambiguation)
