= Sophia Hall =

American judge

Sophia Hall (born July 10, 1943) is an American judge. Elected to the court in 1980, in 1992, she became the first woman named as a Presiding Judge in the Circuit Court of Cook County in Illinois.

== Education ==
Hall received her B.A. in history from the University of Wisconsin in 1964. She received her J.D. in 1967 from Northwestern University Pritzker School of Law.

== Career ==
Hall began her career working at McCoy, Ming & Black in Chicago. In 1976, she joined Mitchell, Hall, Jones & Black and worked for them for four years before her election to Circuit Court judge in 1980.

Hall was the first woman to become a Presiding Judge in the Circuit Court of Cook County in 1992. She now serves as the presiding judge over the Resource Section of the Juvenile Justice and Child Protection Department at the Cook County Circuit Court. She ran for retention in 2016.

== Awards ==
- Today’s Chicago Woman Hall of Fame
- Civil Rights Award from the Cook County Bar Association
- Appeared in Who’s Who of America 46th Edition

== Personal life ==
Hall was born in Chicago, Illinois. She attended the University of Chicago Laboratory Schools for high school.
