= Barbara Hall =

Barbara Hall may refer to:

- Barbara Hall (1919–2014), pen name of cartoonist Barbara Fiske Calhoun
- Barbara Hall (editor) (1923–2022), British crossword puzzles editor for the Sunday Times
- Barbara Feldon (born Barbara Hall, 1933), American actress
- Barbara Hall (politician) (born 1946), Canadian lawyer, public servant and former politician
- Barbara Hall (artist), Australian artist involved with the Women's Art Movement in Sydney in the 1970s–80s
- Barbara Hall (TV producer) (born 1961), American writer and producer of television series

== See also ==
- Barbara Partee (Barbara Hall Partee, born 1940), professor of linguistics
