= O. B. Grayson Hall Jr. =

American banking executive

- Born: c. 1958
- Education: Sewanee: The University of the South; University of Alabama
- Occupation: Banking executive

O. B. Grayson Hall Jr., also known as Grayson Hall, (born c. 1958) is an American banking executive. He serves as the chairman and chief executive officer of the Regions Financial Corporation.

== Early life ==
Hall was born circa 1958. He "grew up on a potato farm in Fort Payne, Alabama." He graduated from Sewanee: The University of the South in 1979, where he earned a Bachelor of Science degree. He earned a master in business administration from the University of Alabama in 1980.

== Career ==
Hall joined the Regions Financial Corporation in 1980. He has served as its chief executive officer since 2010, and as its chairman since 2013. He earned "just under $12 million" in 2012.

Hall was awarded the 2016 Mann Medal in Ethics and Leadership by Samford University in 2015.
