= Hazel Hall =

Hazel Hall may refer to:

- Hazel Hall (poet) (1886–1924), American poet
- Hazel Hall (information scientist) (born 1963), British information scientist and academic
