= Elwin Hall =

American rugby union player (b. 1891)

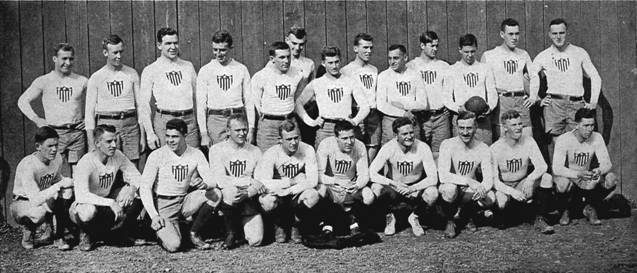
- Hall with the US team in 1913 (pictured front row, fifth from left)
- Full name: Elwin Benoni Hall
- Born: March 24, 1891 Ventura, California
- Died: January 20, 1949 (aged 57) Los Angeles, California
- Height: 5 ft 10 in (1.78 m)
- Weight: 162 lb (73 kg)
- University: Stanford University

Rugby union career
- Position: Front Row
Amateur team(s)
Years	Team	Apps	(Points)
1910–1914	Stanford University		
- Correct as of January 8, 2019
International career
Years	Team	Apps	(Points)
1913	United States	1	(0)
- Correct as of January 8, 2019

Elwin Benoni Hall (March 24, 1891 – January 20, 1949) was an American rugby union player who played at hooker for the United States men's national team in its first capped match against New Zealand in 1913.

== Biography ==
Elwin Hall was born on March 24, 1891, in Ventura, California, the son of Elwin Seth Hall and Robertine Buntin Hall (born Hines).

Hall attended Stanford University beginning in 1910 and was a member of the university's rugby teams. With the Stanford rugby team, Hall played in the front row. On November 15, 1913, Hall played for the United States at hooker in its first test match against New Zealand—a 51–3 defeat.

Hall graduated from Stanford in 1915 with a degree in geology. On January 6, 1916, Hall married Mary L. Bacon in Los Angeles, California. The couple had two children—a son and a daughter. In the course of his career in the petroleum industry, Hall became a vice president and general manager of the Montacal Oil Company in Southern California. Hall died on January 20, 1949, in Los Angeles at the age of 57.
