= Newton Hall =

Newton Hall may refer to:

- Bank Newton Hall, alternatively known as "Newton Hall", a house in North Yorkshire
- Newton Hall, Bywell, a location, former civil parish and country house in Northumberland, England
- Newton Hall, Durham, a large housing estate in County Durham, England
- Newton Hall, Mobberley, a country house near Mobberley, Cheshire, England
- Newton Hall (Newton-by-the-Sea), an 18th-century country house in Newton-by-the-Sea, Northumberland, England
- Newton Hall, Newton on the Moor, an 18th-century country house in Newton on the Moor, Northumberland, England
- Newton H. Hall (1842–1911), American infantryman in the Union Army
