= Coombe Hall =

Scottish footballer

Personal information
- Date of birth: 17 September 1871
- Place of birth: Newhaven, Edinburgh, Scotland
- Date of death: 24 February 1932 (aged 60)
- Place of death: Port Elizabeth, Eastern Cape, South Africa
- Position: Forward

Senior career*
Years	Team	Apps	(Gls)
- St Bernard's
1890–1895	Blackburn Rovers	79	(26)
1895–1896	St Bernard's	15	(2)
- * Club domestic league appearances and goals

Coombe Hall (also spelt Combe; 17 September 1871 – 24 February 1932) was a Scottish footballer who played in the Football League for Blackburn Rovers. He won the FA Cup with Blackburn in 1891, and the Scottish Cup with St Bernard's in 1895.

Hall moved to South Africa, where he died in 1932.
