= Roy Hall =

Roy Hall may refer to:

- Roy Hall (American football) (born 1983), American football player
- Roy Hall (racing driver) (1920–1991), American racing driver
- Roy Hall (musician) (1922–1984), American musician
