= Lord Hall =

Lord Hall may refer to:

- Tony Hall, Baron Hall of Birkenhead (born 1951), former Director-General of the BBC
- George Hall, 1st Viscount Hall (1881–1965), British Labour politician, Secretary of State for the Colonies, First Lord of the Admiralty
  - Viscount Hall, a title in the Peerage of the UK
