= Corey Hall =

Corey Hall may refer to:

- Corey Hall (rugby league)
- Corey Hall (American football)

== See also ==
- Cory Hall, American football coach and player
- Korey Hall, American football player
