= Nick Hall =

Nick Hall may refer to:

- Nick Hall (badminton) (born 1970), badminton competitor for New Zealand
- Nick Hall (singer) (born 1973), English singer-songwriter
- Nick Vine Hall (1944–2006), Australian genealogist

== See also ==
- Nicholas Hall, Australian jockey
