= Joan Hall =

Joan Hall may refer to:

- Joan Hall (Australian politician) (born 1946), Australian politician
- Joan Hall (British politician) (1935–2026), British politician
