= Craig Hall =

Craig Hall may refer to:

- Craig Hall (politician), American state representative in Utah
- Craig Hall (actor) (born 1974), New Zealand actor
- Craig Hall (rugby league, born 1977), Australian rugby league player
- Craig Hall (dancer) (born c. 1981), American ballet master and retired ballet dancer
- Craig Hall (rugby league, born 1988), English rugby league player
