= Andrew Hall (disambiguation) =

Andrew Hall (born 1975) is a South African cricketer.

Andrew or Andy Hall may also refer to:

- Andrew Hall (actor) (1954–2019), English actor and director
- Andrew Hall (English cricketer) (born 1973), English cricketer
- Andrew Hall (hedge fund manager), British hedge fund manager and former head of Phibro
- Andrew Hall (RAF officer), Commandant General RAF Regiment
- Andrew Hall (rugby union) (born 1979), Scotland international rugby union player
- Andy Hall (activist) (born 1979), British lawyer and migration expert
- Andy Hall (American football) (born 1980), American football player
- Drew Hall (born 1963), American Major League Baseball pitcher
- Andrew Hall, drummer for Destroy Destroy Destroy and The Showdown
