= Valerie Hall =

Irish paleontologist

Valerie Hall (1946–2016) was a professor in Palaeoecology at Queen's University Belfast until her retirement in 2010, after which she remained a professor emerita. She gained a 2:2 in botany at Queen's University Belfast in 1968 and a PhD in Palaeoecology in 1989. She has produced a number of publications of which the best known may be Flora Hibernica, which she co-wrote along with J. Pilcher and published in 2001.

She was the Director of Research in the School of Archaeology-Palaeoecology at Queen's University Belfast.

Valerie was Vice President of the INQUA Commission for Tephrochronology and Volcanology and was the Honorary Company Secretary of the Irish Naturalists' Journal Ltd.

== Publications ==
She produced 30 peer-reviewed papers as listed in Scopus. The most cited is "Dates of Holocene Icelandic volcanic eruptions from tephra layers in Irish peats" Pilcher, J.R., Hall, V.A., McCormac, F.G. Holocene 5 (1), pp. 103–110, (1995), which has been cited 85 times by March 2010.

- Hall, V.A. and Bunting, L. (2000) Tephra-dated pollen studies of medieval landscapes in the north of Ireland. In: Gaelic Ireland c.1250-1650: land lordship and settlement. Eds P. Duffy, D. Edwards and E. Fitzpatrick. Four Courts Press Dublin, 207–222.
- Hall, V.A. (2000) A comparative study of the documentary and pollen analytical records of the vegetational history of the Irish landscape, 200-1650 AD. Peritia 14, 342 -371.
- Hall, V.A. (2001) Ancient record keepers. Wild Ireland 1 (2), 54–56.
- Hall, V.A., Holmes, J. and Wilson, P. (2001) Holocene tephrochronological studies in the Falkland Islands. In Tephras; chronology and archaeology, (eds) E. Juvigne and J.P. Raynal. Les dossiers de l'Archeo-logis No 1, 39–44.
- Hall V.A. and Mauquoy D. (2005) Tephra-dated climate and human-impact studies during the last 1500 years from a raised bog in central Ireland. The Holocene 15, 1086–1093.
- Hall, V.A. and Pilcher, J.R. (2002) Late-Quaternary Icelandic tephras in Ireland and Great Britain: detection, characterization and usefulness. The Holocene 12, 223–230.
- Pilcher, J.R. and Hall, V.A. (2001) Flora Hibernica: the wild flowers, plants and trees of Ireland. Collins Press, Cork.
