= Ethel Hall =

American silent film actress

- Born: 1898; Fresno, California, United States
- Died: 1927 (aged 28–29); Merced River near Merced, California, United States
- Occupation: silent film actress
- Spouse: Oscar Reeves

Ethel Hall (1898–1927) was an American silent film actress who died at the age of 29 on June 29, 1927, when her boat capsized in the rapids of the Merced River near the town of Merced in the San Joaquin Valley. At the time she was performing as a stunt double for actress Dorothy Dwan in the film Tumbling River.

Hall was accompanied in the boat by Wallace MacDonald, who played villains in motion pictures. The actors were supposed to be rescued by a group before they entered the foot of the rapids. When the boat suddenly overturned McDonald was able to swim ashore. However Hall's head struck a rock and she was taken out of the water unconscious and soon expired. Filming was halted for just a few hours but Fox Film paid nearly $200,000 in compensation.

She was the daughter of James Burns and Mrs. John Gee of Fresno, and she had two younger brothers. She had just recently wed stage actor John Drayer, who was performing in Seattle at the time of her fatal accident. The film's male lead, Tom Mix, was injured in a horseback accident just a few weeks earlier.

Hall was earlier married to Oscar Reeves.

A coroner's inquest on June 30, 1927, ruled that Hall's death resulted from "Concussion of the brain due to traumatism, caused by blows of rocks on the head" as river currents carried Hall.

Hall also competed in rodeo events, once taking second place in competition to determine the world's champion female broncho rider.
