= Dilmus Hall =

American sculptor (1896–1987)

- Hall in 2014
- Born: 1896; Athens, Georgia, U.S.
- Died: 1987 (aged 90–91); Athens, Georgia, U.S.
- Known for: Sculpture and assemblage
- Movement: Modern art

Dilmus Hall (1896–1987) was a modern American sculptor from Athens, Georgia.

== Life ==
Dilmus Hall was born in Oconee County, Georgia on a cotton farm. His large family was headed by his father, who was also a blacksmith. When Hall was 13 years old, he moved with his family to neighboring Athens, Georgia. Four years later, he entered the United States Army Medical Corps and became a stretcher-bearer during World War I. He was stationed in various places throughout Europe, notably Belgium, and European art in the first quarter of the 20th century influenced his sculptural practice later in life.

Hall had many careers throughout his life after returning from the war, of which included a hotel bell captain and waiter, a sorority house custodian at the University of Georgia, and a stonemason for a construction company. He retired in 1961 to focus on his art. He was married to Zaydie Hall, and although they never had children, Hall viewed his sculptures as his children. When doctors told him and Zaydie that they could not bear children, he remarked "Fooled him! Whooee, yes, I fooled him. He didn't know me, didn't know about the gift of my talent. 'Cause I sure did make children. I'm still making 'em, out of concrete and whatever else I can find to do with." Zaydie died in 1973 and Hall died 15 years later.

== Career ==
Although Hall made figurines and drew as a child, his efforts were only recognized by his mother, who encouraged his creativity. He began to make sculptures with more regularity once he settled down in Athens, Georgia after the war and wanted to adorn his home and yard with personalized, often spiritual, decor. He developed arthritis as he aged, and subsequently began drawing instead of sculpting. Although he became a nationally recognized and sought-after artist, he was known for giving away all of the money he made. He carried around two thousand dollars in his overalls that he would give away to his neighbors in need.

=== Inspiration ===
Hall held very strong faith and he believed that Satan was a very active catalyst for chaos in the earthly realm. Hall believed that the devil could coerce humans into any evil act. This is evident in his life-size, yard sculpture, Devil and the Drunk Man in which a figure of a seemingly unconscious man lays supine at the feet of a smiling, mischievous devil. Hall believed that his sculptures of devils acted as charms, which kept evil away once the owner took possession of the charm. His use of found objects to religious and spiritual effect stood in contrast to other modern artists' use of found materials for surrealist effect, such as Duchamp's Bicycle Wheel. Thus, Hall's work demands scholars ask the question of "whether the mythic and spiritual can act on this banality and transform its meaning."

Hall also made many iterations of the crucifix, and "fanciful human and animal sculptures."

=== Yard art tradition ===
Scholars connect Hall's tradition of yard and home decorum with the African American, and larger African diasporic tradition of Yard Art. "The process of 'working in the yard' or 'dressing the yard' to create outdoor displays ... with a seemingly unlimited assortment of materials: bottles, tires, secondhand housewares, real and artificial flowers, reflective objects, tools, garments, automobile parts, special plantings, wires and ropes, seats, stones and roots, as well as occasional hand-lettered signs..." served as a "make-do" outlet of self-expression and spiritual expression in systematically disenfranchised communities. Just as a yard represents the bridge between public and private life, yard art came to be recognized as a way of connecting the public and private lives of the artists and home-owners. The term "yard show" was first coined in the 1980s by African Art historian Robert Farris Thomson, who "posited the black yard as a displaced, personalized religious site or shrine whose terms inform much of the creative activities of black people in the diaspora."

=== Materials ===
Hall worked predominantly in wood, clay, cement, house paint, and other found materials.

== Selected exhibitions ==
Hall's work has been shown in the following exhibitions:

- O, Appalachia: Artists of the Southern Mountains. 1989, Huntington Museum of Art, Huntington, West Virginia.
- Unsigned, Unsung.. Whereabouts Unknown!: Make-Do Art of the American Outlands. February 5 – March 7, 1993, Florida State University Art Gallery and Museum, Tallahassee.
- The Radiant Object:Self-Taught Artists from the Volkersz Collection. January 31 – February 18, 1994, Haynes Fine Arts Gallery – Montana State University, Bozeman.
- Fundamental Soul: The Hager Gift of African American Self-Taught Art. January 26 – March 10, 1996, Rockford Art Museum, Rockford, Illinois.
- Outsider Art: an Exploration of Chicago Collections. December 9, 1996 – February 28, 1997, Chicago Cultural Center, Chicago, Illinois.
- Southern Spirit: the Hill Collection. February 21 – March 31, 2000, Museum of Art, Tallahassee, Florida.
- Figure 8. March 8 – April 16, 2005, Barbara Archer Gallery, Atlanta, Georgia
- Crossroads: Spirituality in American Folk Traditions. November 17, 2007 – February 24, 2008, Owensboro Museum of Fine Art, Owensboro, Kentucky.
- Pure Folk: Celebrating the Folk Art Society of America. September 14 – November 10, 2012, Barbara Archer Gallery, Atlanta, Georgia.
- Self-taught, Outsider, Visionary: Highlights from the Folk Art Collection. October 5, 2013 – March 30, 2014, Huntington Museum of Art, Huntington, West Virginia.
- From the Heart: Folk Art on Paper. August 6 – November 13, 2016, Museum of St. Petersburg, St. Petersburg, Florida
- What Carried Us Over:Gifts from the Gordon W. Bailey Collection. September 13, 2019 – April 19, 2020. Pérez Art Museum Miami, Florida

== Collections ==
Hall's work is in the permanent collections of the following museums:

- American Folk Art Museum
- Huntington Museum of Art
- Clark Atlanta University
- High Museum of Art
- Milwaukee Art Museum
- Archives of American Art – Smithsonian
- Haggerty Museum of Art/ Marquette University
- Van Vechten Gallery at Fisk University
- Rockford Art Museum
- Owensboro Museum of Fine Art
- St. James Place Folk Art Museum
- Pérez Art Museum Miami
