= Murray Hall =

Murray Hall may refer to:

== People ==
- Murray Hall (politician) (1841–1901), New York City bail bondsman and Tammany Hall politician
- Murray Hall (ice hockey) (born 1940), retired professional ice hockey player
- Murray Hall (cyclist) (born 1953), Australian cyclist

== Buildings ==
- Murray Masonic Hall, a building in Murray, Idaho
- Voorhees Mall (AKA Murray Hall), an academic building at Rutgers University
