= Gordon Hall =

Gordon Hall may refer to:

== People ==
- Gordon Hall (missionary) (1784–1826), American missionary
- Gordon R. Hall (1926–2025), Utah Supreme Court justice
- Gordon Langley Hall (1922–2000), English author and biographer who wrote as Dawn Langley Simmons
- Gordon Hall (died 2021), British video game designer and co-founder of Rockstar Leeds

== Structures ==
- Gordon Hall (Dexter, Michigan), a historic house
- Gordon Hall, Tianjin, China, demolished administrative headquarters of the British concession of Tianjin, built in 1890

== See also ==
- Gordon Hall Caine (1884–1962), British publisher and Conservative politician
- Gordon Hall Gerould (1877–1953), philologist and folklorist of the United States
- Eric Gordon Hall (1922–1998), Pakistan Air Force bomber and fighter pilot
