= Jordan Hall =

Jordan Hall may refer to:

== People ==
- Jordan Aaron Hall (born 2002), American actor, director and writer
- Jordan Hall (writer), writer of the web series Carmilla
- Jordan Hall (lacrosse) (born 1984), Canadian lacrosse player
- Jordan Hall (basketball) (born 2002), American basketball player
- Jordan Hall (linebacker), American football player
- Jordan Hall (defensive tackle), American football player

== Places ==
- Jordan Hall (Boston), a concert hall in Boston, Massachusetts, and the principal performance space of the New England Conservatory
- Jordan Hall, was the name of a building on the Stanford University Main Quad from 1917 to 2020 which is in the process of getting a new permanent name
- Jordan Hall, was the name of the life sciences building on the Bloomington campus of Indiana University from 1956 to 2020
