= Jane Hall =

Jane Hall may refer to:

== People ==
- Jane Hall (journalist), former Fox News Channel pundit
- Jane Hall (actress) (born 1971), Australian actress
- Jane Hamilton Hall (1915–1981) American physicist
- Jane Hall (rower) (born 1973), British rower
- Jane Hall (author), Canadian author of The Red Wall: A Woman in the RCMP
- Jane Hall (Australian health economist)

== TV and film ==
- Jane Hall (TV series), British television drama
