= Tyler Hall =

Tyler Hall may refer to:

- Tyler Hall (American football) (born 1998), American football player
- Tyler Hall (basketball) (born 1997), American basketball player
- Tyler Hall (soccer) (born 2006), American soccer player

== See also ==
- Tyler City Hall, Tyler, Texas, US
