= G. Norman Hall =

South African veterinary pathologist

George Norman Alfred Hall (1885–1965) was a South African veterinary pathologist who for many years served in the British colonial service as a veterinary pathologist in various British African colonies. In these roles, he conducted several studies into the diagnosis and treatment of rinderpest and tuberculosis in cattle, and wrote several journal articles on various livestock diseases.

== Career ==
Hall was a member of the Royal College of Veterinary Surgeons. In August 1913, he entered the British colonial service as a veterinary officer in the British East African Protectorate (now Kenya). He later moved to colonial Uganda where he served as the veterinary pathologist in charge of the veterinary laboratory in Entebbe. In 1929, Hall transferred his service to the Nigerian colonial veterinary department as the veterinary pathologist in charge of the veterinary research laboratory in Vom on the Jos Plateau.

Based on his experiences working combatting bovine epizootics in colonial Nigeria and other colonial territories, Hall published several academic papers. In 1933, he completed his dissertation on rinderpest immunization at the University of Zurich, qualifying as a Doctor of Veterinary Medicine (DVM).

Later in 1933, Hall was seconded to the Gambia to develop a scheme for the British colony's campaign against rinderpest and other cattle epizootics. He was later retained in there substantively as the veterinary director for about 20 years.

Hall was married to Mary Delorus Wilkinson, but they were divorced in 1957. He was survived by his second wife, Freda Mary Hall.

The G. Norman Hall Gold Medal for outstanding research into animal diseases was established posthumously in his honour, and has been awarded approximately every three years since 1969 by the Royal College of Veterinary Surgeons Trust.

== Selected publications ==
- Hall, G.Norman (1928). "Spirochætes in the blood of a goat". Transactions of the Royal Society of Tropical Medicine and Hygiene. 21 (5): 423–425. doi:10.1016/s0035-9203(28)90075-9. ISSN 0035-9203.
- Hall, G. Norman; Beaton, W.G. (1931). "The Infectivity of the Blood in Artificial and Natural Cases of Bovine Pleuro-Pneumonia". Journal of Comparative Pathology and Therapeutics. 44: 170–179. doi:10.1016/s0368-1742(31)80015-3. ISSN 0368-1742.
- Frei, W.; Hall, G. Norman (1931). "The Cultivation of Anaerobic Bacteria in Media Containing Cystein". The Veterinary Journal. 87 (6): 259–266. doi:10.1016/s0372-5545(17)40404-4. ISSN 0372-5545.
- Hall, G. Norman (1932). "Tuberculosis in Cattle—Its Occurrence in Northern Nigeria". The Veterinary Journal. 88 (8): 327–331. doi:10.1016/s0372-5545(17)39706-7. ISSN 0372-5545.
- Hall, G. Norman (1932). "Polyneuritis in Fowls: A Note on the Occurrence of the Disease in Northern Nigeria". The Veterinary Journal. 88 (8): 337–340. doi:10.1016/s0372-5545(17)39708-0. ISSN 0372-5545.
- Thomson, J. Gordon; Hall, G. Norman (1933). "The occurrence of Babesia motasi Wenyon, 1926, in sheep in Northern Nigeria, with a discussion on the classification of the Piroplasms". Journal of Comparative Pathology and Therapeutics. 46: 218–231. doi:10.1016/s0368-1742(33)80028-2. ISSN 0368-1742.
- Hall, G. Norman; Ford, J. (1934). "Immunisation Against Anthrax with a Saponified Culture". The Veterinary Journal. 90 (11): 446–454. doi:10.1016/s0372-5545(17)38356-6. ISSN 0372-5545.
