= Katie Hall =

Katie Hall may refer to:

- Katie Hall (American politician) (1938–2012), American politician
- Katie Hall (cyclist) (born 1987), American cyclist
- Katie Hall (actress) (born 1990), British actress and soprano
- Katie Hall (Australian politician), member of the Victorian Legislative Assembly
