= Raewyn Hall =

New Zealand footballer

Personal information
- Full name: Raewyn Hall
- Place of birth: New Zealand

International career
Years	Team	Apps	(Gls)
1975	New Zealand	4	(0)

Raewyn Hall is a former association football player who represented New Zealand at international level.

Hall made her Football Ferns debut in their first ever international as they beat Hong Kong 2–0 on 25 August 1975 at the inaugural AFC Women's Asian Cup. She finished her international career with 4 caps to her credit.

== Honours ==
New Zealand

- AFC Women's Championship: 1975
