= Ian Hall (statistician) =

British statistician and epidemiologist

- Born: Ian Melvyn Hall
- Education: University of Exeter
- Scientific career
- Fields: Epidemiology; Probability; Statistical inference; Fluid dynamics
- Workplaces: University of Manchester
- Thesis: Quasi-modes and the evolutions of coherent planar vortices (2002)
- Doctoral advisor: Andrew David Gilbert

Ian Melvyn Hall OBE is a British statistician and researcher at the University of Manchester specialising in epidemiology. He is a Professor of Mathematical Epidemiology and Statistics as well as director of the Christabel Pankhurst Institute for Health Technology Research and Innovation. Hall was previously the academic chair of the social care working group for Scientific Advisory Group for Emergencies during the COVID-19 pandemic.

Hall was appointed an Officer of the Order of the British Empire in the 2024 Birthday Honours for services to public health, epidemiology and adult social care, particularly during Covid-19.

Hall was appointed in the inaugural cohort of Fellows of the Academy for the Mathematical Sciences.

== Education and early career ==
Hall studied mathematics at the University of Exeter, receiving the MMath in pure mathematics and applied mathematics in 1999. After graduation, he remained at Exeter for postgraduate studies under the supervision of Andrew David Gilbert and Andrew P. Bassom. He was awarded a doctorate in applied mathematics in 2003, on the topic of vortex dynamics.

After completing his PhD, Hall spent 15 years working for Public Health England, where he led mathematical modelling teams planning public health and emergency responses to emerging disease outbreaks. From 2018 onwards, Hall held senior modelling roles, becoming an Honorary Senior Principal Modeller in Emergency Preparedness in 2019 and continuing this role at the UK Health Security Agency. He has studied disease transmission and vaccination on cruise ships, care homes and prisons.

== Covid-19 response ==
During the Covid-19 pandemic, Hall continued to participate in scientific advisory groups and modelling of the spread of disease. This included being deputy chair of the Scientific Pandemic Influenza Group on Modelling by November 2020.

Working with anonymised data from a health tracking app, Hall was among statisticians analysing data for a publicly available heat map of individuals with Covid-19 symptoms. This heatmap was created alongside colleagues at the Universities of Liverpool and Manchester.

Hall was interviewed on LBC discussing the importance of compliance with lockdown measures. He said that the exponential growth in Covid-19 infections would have been worse if lockdown measures had not taken place, and that the NHS could have been overwhelmed.

In 2022, Hall was quoted in a Guardian article on changes to rules around visiting care homes in England.

In 2023 and 2025, Hall gave witness statements as part of the UK's Covid-19 inquiry. In 2023, he said that he believed the first lockdown to be necessary, and denied that there was an excessive focus on modelling.

== Selected publications ==
- Outbreaks in care homes may lead to substantial disease burden if not mitigated (2021)
- Modelling the impact of pandemic influenza in the UK (2004)
- Excess mortality for care home residents during the frist 23 weeks of the COVID-19 pandemic in England - a national cohort study (2021)
