= Dos Madres Press =

Dos Madres Press is a small press based in Loveland, Ohio. The press, founded in 2004, specializes in books of poetry. Authors published by the press include Norman Finkelstein, Richard Hague, Michael Heller, Roald Hoffmann, Keith Holyoak, Burt Kimmelman, Mario Markus, Patricia Monaghan, Manuel Iris, and Eileen Tabios. It is registered as an Ohio Not For Profit Corporation and a 501 (c)(3) qualified public charity.

The editor and founder of Dos Madres Press is Robert Murphy; his wife, Elizabeth Murphy, is its book designer. In 2016, Dos Madres Press had its debut appearance with five authors at the annual AWP Conference & Bookfair.
