= Brookbank =

Brookbank is a surname. Notable people with the surname include:

- Joseph Brookbank (born 1612), English cleric and schoolmaster
- Kilee Brookbank (born 1998), American burn survivor and author
- Sheldon Brookbank (born 1980), Canadian ice hockey player and coach
- Wade Brookbank (born 1977), Canadian ice hockey player and scout
