= Arthur Dewey =

Arthur Dewey may refer to:

- Arthur E. Dewey, U.S. Assistant Secretary of State
- Arthur J. Dewey, U.S. biblical scholar
