= Admiral Hall =

Admiral Hall may refer to:

- John L. Hall Jr. (1891–1978), U.S. Navy admiral
- John Talbot Savignac Hall (1896–1964), British Royal Navy rear admiral
- Mary Fields Hall (born 1934), U.S. Navy rear admiral
- Norman B. Hall (1886–1962), U.S. Coast Guard rear admiral
- Reginald Hall (1870–1943), British Royal Navy admiral
- Thomas F. Hall (born 1939), U.S. Navy rear admiral
- Victor W. Hall (fl. 1970s–2020s), U.S. Navy rear admiral
- William Hutcheon Hall (c. 1797–1878), British Royal Navy admiral

== See also ==
- Admiral King-Hall (disambiguation)
- Theodore Hallett (1878–1956), British Royal Navy vice admiral
