= Admiral King-Hall =

Admiral King-Hall may refer to:

- George King-Hall (1850–1939), British Royal Navy admiral
- Herbert King-Hall (1862–1936), British Royal Navy admiral
- William King-Hall (1816–1886), British Royal Navy admiral

== See also ==
- Admiral Hall (disambiguation)
- Admiral King (disambiguation)
