= Xavier University =

Jesuit university in Cincinnati, Ohio, US

Coordinates: 39.14868°N 84.47799°W

- Latin: Universitas Xaveriana
- Former names: Athenaeum (1831–1840); St. Xavier College (1840–1930)
- Motto: Vidit Mirabilia Magna (Latin)
- Motto in English: He has seen great wonders
- Type: Private university
- Established: 1831; 195 years ago
- Religious affiliation: Catholic (Jesuit)
- Academic affiliations: AJCU ACCU; GCCCU CIC
- Endowment: $300.65 million (2025)
- President: Colleen Hanycz
- Provost: Rachel Chrastil
- Faculty: 392 Full-time; 399 Part-time
- Students: 4,767 (spring 2026)
- Undergraduates: 3,541 (spring 2026)
- Postgraduates: 1,226 (spring 2026)
- Location: Cincinnati, Ohio, United States
- Campus: 205 acres (83.0 ha)
- Colors: Navy Blue - White - Silver
- Nickname: Musketeers
- Sporting affiliations: NCAA Division I – Big East Conference
- Mascots: D'Artagnan the Musketeer; The Blue Blob
- Website: xavier.edu

Xavier University (/ˈzeɪvjər/ ZAY-vyure) is a private Jesuit university in Cincinnati, Ohio, United States. It is the sixth-oldest Catholic and fourth-oldest Jesuit university in the United States. Xavier had an enrollment of approximately 4,770 undergraduate and graduate students as of 2026.

Xavier University provides an education in the Jesuit tradition, which emphasizes learning through community service, interdisciplinary courses and the engagement of faith, theology, philosophy and ethics studies. Xavier's athletic teams, known as the Xavier Musketeers, compete in the National Collegiate Athletic Association (NCAA) Division I level in the Big East Conference.

== History ==
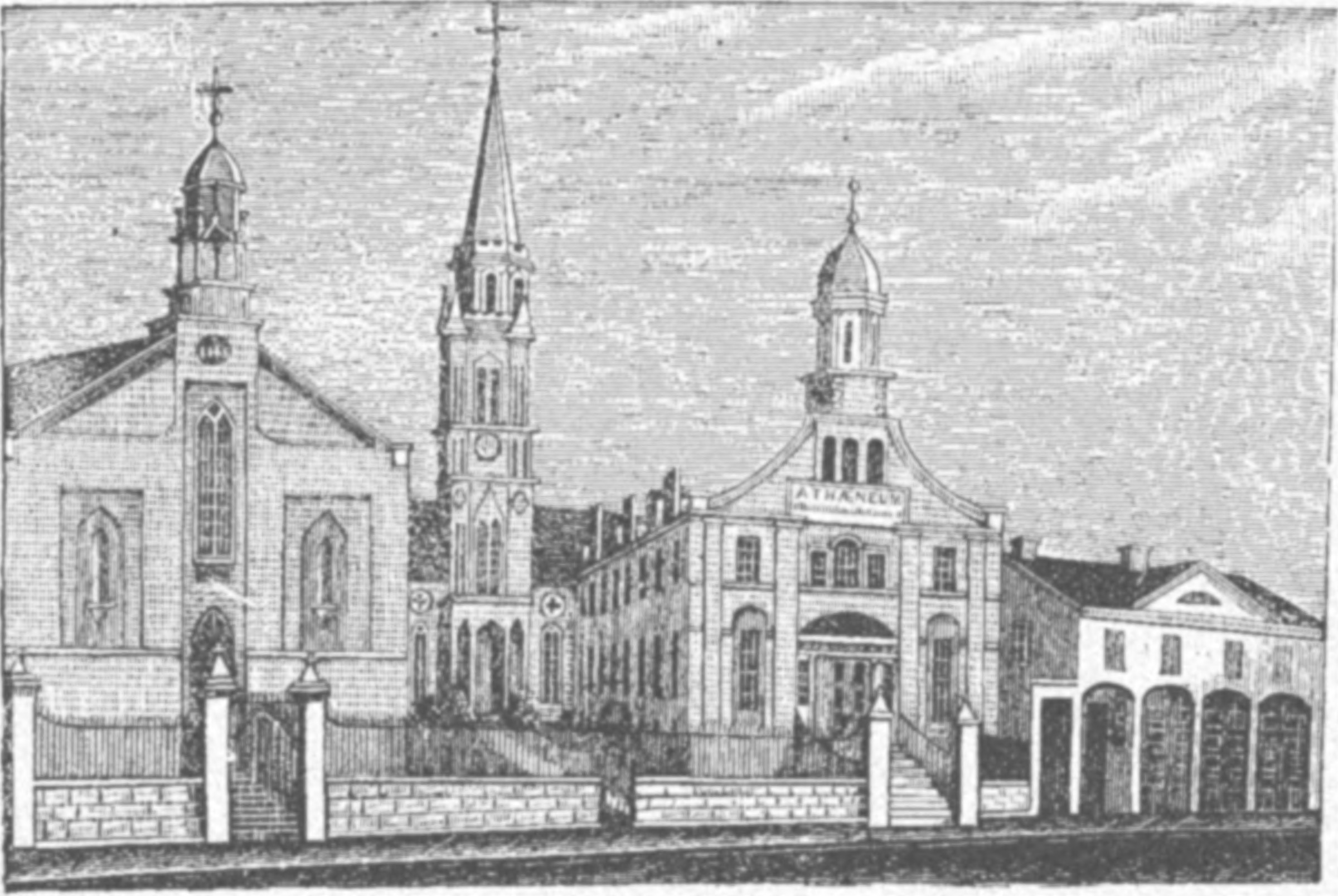
St. Xavier Church, bishop's residence, and St. Xavier College in 1848

Xavier University is the fourth oldest Jesuit University and the sixth oldest Catholic university in the United States. The school was founded in 1831 as a men's college in downtown Cincinnati next to St. Francis Xavier Church on Sycamore Street. The Athenaeum, as it was then called, was dedicated to the patronage of Saint Francis Xavier by Bishop Edward Fenwick on October 17, 1831. Upon Bishop John Baptist Purcell's request, the Society of Jesus took control of The Athenaeum in 1840, and the name was changed to St. Xavier College in honor of the 16th century Spanish Jesuit missionary, St. Francis Xavier who, like the founder of the Jesuits, Ignatius Loyola, was a Spanish Navarrese.

St. Xavier College moved in 1912 to its current Evanston location, about 5 miles (8.0 km) north of downtown Cincinnati, after the purchase of 26 acres (0.11 km^{2}) from the Avondale Athletic Club. The "original" Athenaeum is now the seminary of the Archdiocese of Cincinnati. St. Xavier College and St. Xavier High School officially split in 1919, though they did not become financially independent until 1934. The school's name was changed a second time to its current name, Xavier University, in 1930.

Xavier fully admitted women starting in 1969, but women began attending the college in 1914 in the evening, weekend, and summer school divisions. Edgecliff College, another Catholic college in Cincinnati, merged with Xavier University in 1980.

== Academics ==
Student body composition as of May 2, 2022
Race and ethnicity	Total
White	75%
Black	10%
Hispanic	6%
Other (Note: Other consists of Multiracial Americans & those who prefer to not say.)	5%
Asian	3%
Foreign national	1%
Economic diversity
Low-income (Note: The percentage of students who received an income-based federal Pell grant intended for low-income students.)	15%
Affluent (Note: The percentage of students who are a part of the American middle class at the bare minimum.)	85%

=== Colleges and schools ===
The university is organized into four (4) main academic colleges that function as separate schools within the university:

- College of Arts and Sciences
- College of Health and Human Sciences
- College of Nursing
- Williams College of Business

In addition, Xavier also operates the College of Osteopathic Medicine as a professional school (beginning in 2027) as part of its broader academic system.

=== Majors and minors ===
Xavier University has more than 90 undergraduate majors and 40 graduate programs within the College of Arts and Sciences, the College of Health and Human Sciences, the College of Nursing and the Williams College of Business. Undergraduate majors include nursing, business, biomedical sciences, education, health science and wellness, speech language and communication sciences, psychology, biology, exploratory, non-profit management, exercise science, sport management, sport marketing and finance. All students must complete the core curriculum (see below).

=== Rankings ===
- Xavier was ranked tied for No. 208 among "National Universities" by U.S. News & World Report for its 2026 edition of America's Best Colleges report.
- Princeton Review ranked Xavier among its "Best 378 Colleges in America" for 2027

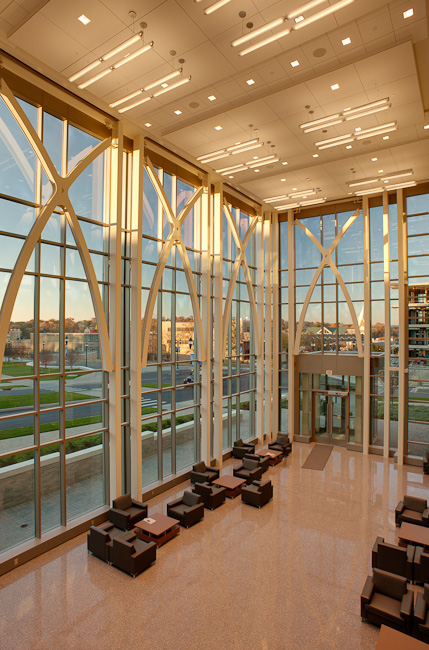
Smith Hall, which houses the Williams College of Business

=== Core curriculum ===
Undergraduate students attending Xavier must complete a significant number of distribution requirements that are more commonly known as the Core Curriculum. There are required courses in: theology, philosophy, mathematics, fine arts, history, physical science, literature, second language, and the social sciences.

=== Honorary society chapters ===
Xavier has several honorary society chapters, including:

- Alpha Sigma Nu, the honor society of Jesuit institutions of higher education
- Beta Alpha Psi, an honor organization for financial information students and professionals
- Beta Gamma Sigma, the international honor society serving business programs accredited by AACSB International
- Phi Beta Kappa, an elite honor society present within only 10% of universities
- Mortar Board, national honor society recognizing college seniors
- Eta Sigma Phi, an honor society aimed at preserving interest and scholarship in Classical Studies.

== Campus ==
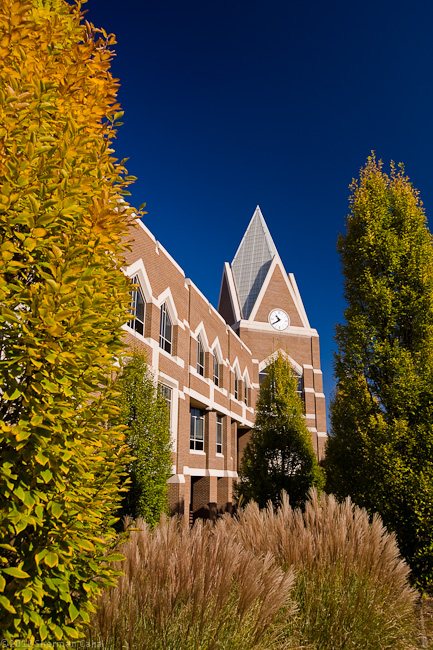
The Gallagher Student Center

The campus covers approximately 205 acres (0.83 km^{2}) in the City of Cincinnati (Evanston neighborhood). At the center of campus are the Gallagher Student Center and Bellarmine Chapel. Bellarmine Chapel's roof is in the shape of a hyperbolic paraboloid, also known as a saddle roof, that will not collapse even if the Chapel walls were removed. The chapel is also home to an active parish community independent of the university.

=== Academic mall ===
Six buildings with castle architecture overlook Victory parkway on one side of the Academic Mall: Lindner Hall (home to the Department of Physics), Logan Hall (home to the Chemistry Department), Albers Hall (home to the Biology Department), Hinkle Hall (home to the Departments of Mathematics, Computer Science, English, History, Philosophy and Theology), Schmidt Hall (houses the University Administration offices) and Edgecliff Hall (home to the Department of Music).

The other side of the Academic mall includes three buildings: Walter Schott Hall (home to the Office of Admission, Office of Financial Aid and the Departments of Modern Languages, Classics, Communication Arts, Political Science, Sociology, and Leadership Studies), McDonald Library (home to the University Library and Archives) and Alter Hall (main classroom building on campus).

Our Lady of Peace Chapel was relocated to the Academic Mall in 2018. Originally constructed in 1938 by Charles F. and Elizabeth R. Williams on their property in Anderson Township, the 22-seat chapel is now located off Dana Avenue on the west end of the Academic Mall.

=== Academic Quad ===
The Academic Quad, also known as the Hoff Quad, is east of the Academic Mall. It includes three buildings: Conaton Learning Commons (home to academic support services), Smith Hall (home to the Williams College of Business) and Hailstones Hall (traditional classroom building).

=== Residential Mall ===
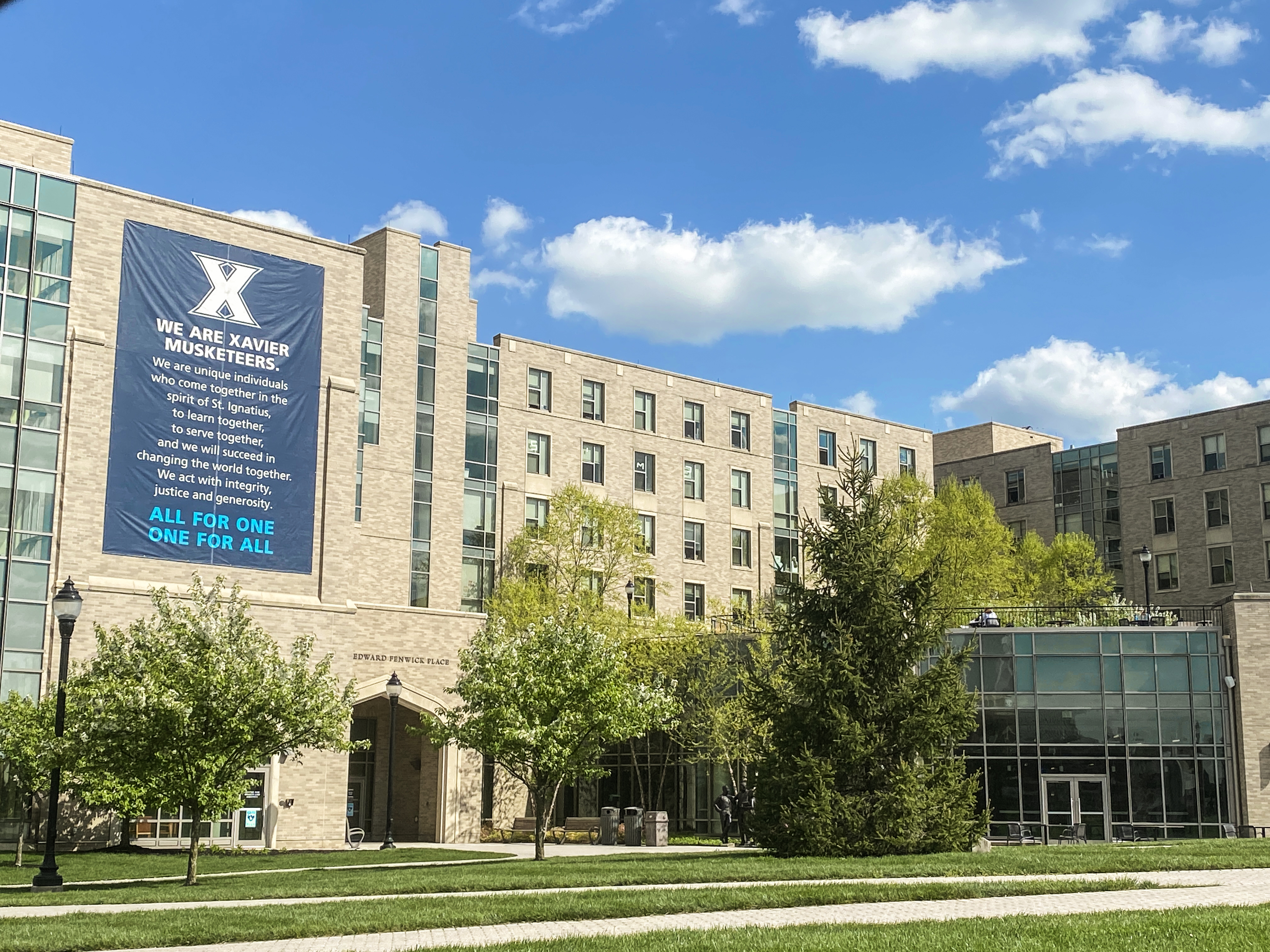
Justice Hall, one of the university's main residence halls

The Residential Mall, north of the Academic mall, includes four underclassmen residence halls: Brockman Hall, Buenger Hall, Kuhlman Hall and Husman Hall. The all-purpose area for students and events between Kuhlman, Husman and Gallagher is referred to as "The Xavier Yard."

A residential complex called Justice Hall (formerly known as Fenwick Place) opened in fall 2011 to the south of the Residential Mall. It is home to the campus dining center in addition to providing housing for upper-class students.

=== West Campus ===
West campus is on the west side of Victory Parkway. Athletic facilities include J. Page Hayden Field, Corcoran Soccer Field, Schmidt Fieldhouse and the Heidt Champion Center (formerly O'Connor Recreational Center).

Academic buildings include: St. Barbara Hall and the Armory (home to Xavier's ROTC program), Joseph Hall (Home to the Education and Sports Studies Departments) and Elet Hall (home to the Department of Psychology).

=== East Campus ===
The Cintas Center, where the Musketeers host their basketball games, is adjacent to the Residential Mall. In addition to the 10,250-seat arena, Cintas also includes the Schiff Conference Center and the James and Caroline Duff Banquet Center. The A. B. Cohen Center, located across the parking lot from Cintas Center, is home to the Art Department and Xavier Art Gallery.

The Health United Building opened in 2019. Located between University Station and the Commons Apartments, the facility houses a recreational center, an upgraded health and wellness center, and classroom facilities and labs for five academic programs: Nursing, Occupational Therapy, Health Services Administration, Sport Studies and Radiologic Technology.

== Athletics ==
Musketeers logo

Xavier competes at the NCAA Division I level in the Big East Conference, and their mascot is D'Artagnan the Musketeer. Xavier sponsors eight intercollegiate sports for men, and eight sports for women. The university's graduation rate of 94% is the third highest graduation rate for athletes in the nation behind Duke University and Stanford University. Xavier sports teams have several traditional rivalries with local universities, including the University of Cincinnati and the Villanova University.

Xavier was a founding member of the Midwestern City Conference in 1979. Renamed the Midwestern Collegiate Conference in 1985, it is now known as the Horizon League. Xavier was a member of the Atlantic 10 Conference from 1995 to 2013 where it enjoyed many successful basketball seasons. On March 20, 2013, the Xavier administration announced that the school will join the newly created Big East following the realignment of the old Big East Conference, and moved to the new conference July 1, 2013.

The basketball and volleyball teams play in the 10,250-seat Cintas Center on campus which opened in 2000.

=== Men's basketball ===
The Xavier men's basketball team is perhaps the best known of the sports sponsored at Xavier. The team has enjoyed considerable recent success, reaching the Elite Eight in the NCAA Tournament in 2004, 2008, and 2017. Since 1985, every men's basketball player who has played as a senior has graduated with a degree. During the era of college football's now-defunct Bowl Championship Series, Xavier was one of only two schools outside the main BCS conferences (a group now known as the Power Five) to be listed among the top 20 most valuable programs in college basketball (the other being UNLV) according to Forbes.

=== Football ===
Xavier fielded an NCAA Division I football team until the 1973 season.

=== Baseball ===
Hayden Field seen from Hinkle Hall

The Xavier baseball team won the 2014 Big East Championship and participated in the Nashville Regional. The 2009 Xavier Baseball team won the Atlantic 10 tournament and participated in the Houston Regional. The Xavier baseball won the 2023 Big East Championship and participated in the Nashville Regional.

=== Swimming ===
The Xavier men's swim team earned the school's first Big East Conference Championship in 2014. The Xavier men's swim team overall has captured the Big East Title in 2014, 2015, 2016, 2019, 2020, and 2021 making it their second three peat and sixth championship in their eight years since joining the conference in 2013.

=== Club sports ===
The club sports program is designed to serve the interests of Xavier University students, faculty, and staff in different sports and recreational activities. These interests may be competitive, recreational, and/or instructional in nature.

In 2017 the Xavier Men's Rugby Club team made it the Final Four in Denver Colorado for the National Small College Rugby Championship. Xavier finished 3rd in the country at the Tournament and was ranked 3rd in the Country that year. The Xavier Rugby Club has been ranked in the Top 20 of the National Collegiate Rugby Conference 7 out of the last 8 years. The Volley Ball team The Xavier Men's Volleyball Club Team took home 2nd place at Nationals in April 2019.In 2022, the Xavier Men's Volleyball Club Team won the national championship.

=== Mascots ===
Xavier is one of a handful of universities with two mascots. D'Artagnan, the Musketeer, is the university's official mascot and is the origin of the school's nickname, The Xavier Musketeers. The Musketeer concept was suggested in 1925 by the late Reverend Francis J. Finn, S.J.

The Blue Blob came about in 1985 when the spirit squad coordinators realized that a more audience-friendly mascot was needed. The musketeer mascot, who sported a handlebar mustache and a prop sword, scared younger spectators. The Blue Blob is a furry creature that has made several television and magazine appearances over the years, including a controversial Playboy appearance. The Blue Blob has Bobble-Body dolls, Plush replicas, and T-shirts made in his likeness, and an annual Blue Blob Appreciation Night during the Musketeer's basketball season. He most recently appeared on two ESPN This is SportsCenter commercials with Pro Football Hall of Fame member Jim Kelly and SportsCenter anchors Scott Van Pelt and John Anderson.

=== Media ===
Most Xavier games can be heard on WLW or WKRC-AM. Joe Sunderman does the play-by-play and Byron Larkin does color commentary for most games. Fox Sports Net Ohio holds the local television rights to the Musketeers basketball games. Brad Johansen does play-by-play and Steve Wolf is the analyst. Over the air stations, WCPO-TV and WSTR-TV have held the rights to Xavier games in the past.

== Faith and service ==
The Dorothy Day Center for Faith and Justice is an important part of Xavier University's mission to form men and women for others.

=== Student programs ===
At the beginning of freshman year, the center gives students opportunities to form community among themselves, with an effort at inclusiveness across all lines of faith and culture. They are then encouraged to join the other students in choosing from a variety of service opportunities.

Students can pursue community service through the following programs: work in the Nexus community garden, weekly service with organizations in the Cincinnati area through the X-CHANGE program, Community Action Day when the whole XU community and alumni are encouraged to give a day of service to the larger community, a monthly service opportunity at St. Francis Seraph Soup Kitchen, and Alternative Breaks offering opportunities to serve in the United States and abroad during fall and spring breaks. A total of 25 immersion trips are offered. It is estimated that students perform more than 60,000 service hours in a year.

Most programs include reflection components and the following programs facilitated by the center are also staged to provoke reflection: Ignatian Family Teach-In for Justice, Stories of Solidarity, Jesuit Martyrs of El Salvador commemoration, and Contemplatives in Action.

More intensive service experiences include the following:

- Summer Service Internship allows 20 students to live on campus while being paid for working at an area non-profit.
- Graduate Internship employs graduates to work along with the CFJ staff.
- Xavier eRecruiting is the center's listing of non-profit internships nationwide. This is supplemented by Idealist.org which includes also international listings. Sponsors of internships include Scripps Howard Foundation, the Catholic Archdiocese, the Catholic Campaign for Human Development, and Community Shares.
- GetAway for First Year Students, with opportunities to organize and make spiritual retreats.
- Graduate School and Year-of-Service Fair introduces students to over 50 options for a year of service after graduation, at home and abroad. Some of the more popular are Peace Corps, Jesuit Volunteer Corps, Public Allies, and Americorps. Long listings of possibilities are on websites hosted by Stanford, Notre Dame, Service Leader, and Volunteer.gov.

== Student newspaper ==
The Xavier Newswire is an independent student newspaper published weekly during the academic year by the students of Xavier University. The Newswire was originally called The Xavierian News and was founded by Xavier's law school in 1915. The paper's staff meets to put together the paper on Tuesday nights. The Publications House, which previous housed the editing team, was demolished on March 10, 2010, and the staff ever since meets in the Gallagher Student Center on campus. The Newswire made its color debut on January 23, 2008.

== Notable alumni ==
- Danny Abramowicz, professional football player
- Naji Marshall, professional basketball player
- George Billman, physiology professor
- J. Kenneth Blackwell, Ohio Secretary of State (1999-2007)
- John Boehner, Speaker of the U.S. House of Representatives for the 112th Congress and 113th Congress, U.S. House of Representatives Minority Leader and Majority Leader
- Kilee Brookbank, author and philanthropist
- Phil H. Bucklew, Naval Officer and professional football player. Credited as the "Father of US Naval Special Warfare"
- Jim Bunning, U.S. Senator from Kentucky and professional baseball player
- Derrick Brown, professional basketball player
- John A. Cade, Maryland State Senator
- Lionel Chalmers, professional basketball player
- Donald D. Clancy, Congressman
- Bill Cunningham, radio talk show host
- Dane Dastillung, professional football player
- John J. Dillon, 35th Indiana Attorney General
- Dennis E. Eckart, politician
- Russell Findlay, first chief marketing officer of Major League Soccer
- Thomas J. Fogarty, surgeon and inventor of the balloon embolectomy catheter
- Edward J. Gardner, politician
- Michael X. Garrett, Commanding General, United States Army Forces Command
- Kaiser Gates, professional basketball player
- Charles Geschke, president and co-founder of Adobe Systems
- Brian Grant, professional basketball player
- Nick Hagglund, professional soccer player
- Richard Hague, poet
- Victor W. Hall, U.S. Navy admiral
- Zach Hankins, professional basketball player
- Michael Hawkins, professional basketball player
- Bob Heleringer, politician and lawyer
- Howard V. Hendrix, science fiction author
- Patricia L. Herbold, U.S. Ambassador to Singapore
- Paul John Hilbert, politician
- Tyrone Hill, professional basketball player
- Jack Hoffman, professional football player
- Greg J. Holbrock, politician
- Tu Holloway, professional basketball player
- Robert Huebner, virologist
- Tyrique Jones, professional basketball player
- Jason Kokrak, professional golfer
- Alfred James Lechner Jr., US federal judge
- John C. Lechleiter, president, CEO, and chairman of Eli Lilly and Company
- John Logsdon, Director of the Space Policy Institute at George Washington University
- Ken Lucas, politician
- Tom Luken, politician
- Mark Lyons, professional basketball player
- Nora McInerny, writer
- Rhine McLin, Mayor of Dayton
- Art Mergenthal, professional football player
- Jack Miles, Pulitzer Prize winner
- Ryan Nemeth, professional wrestler
- Donald C. Nugent, US federal judge
- David Nordyke, educator
- Daniel Edward Pilarczyk, archbishop
- April Phillips, college basketball coach
- James Posey, professional basketball player and coach
- M. Henrietta Reilly, mathematician, and one of the few women to study and later teach there under a special program for Catholic sisters in the Cincinnati region
- Jalen Reynolds, professional basketball player
- Dennis L. Riley, politician
- Richard Romanus, actor
- Robert Romanus, actor
- Romain Sato, professional basketball player
- Chris Seelbach, politician
- Dom Sigillo, professional basketball player
- Julianne Smith, U.S. Ambassador to NATO
- Matt Stainbrook, professional basketball player
- Derek Strong, professional basketball player
- Francis Wade, philosopher
- David West, professional basketball player
- Carroll Williams, professional football player
- Garry Wills, author
- Leo Wise, newspaper editor and publisher

== Notable faculty ==
- Arthur J. Dewey, New Testament scholar
- John J. Gilligan, Congressman and Governor of Ohio
- Paul F. Knitter, theologian
- Richard Polt, Heidegger scholar; typewriter enthusiast
- Henry Heimlich, "inventor" of Heimlich Maneuver, Advanced Clinical Science Professor 1977–89
- Boris Podolsky, physicist and "creator" of the EPR paradox
- Norman Finkelstein, poet and literary critic

== See also ==
- List of Jesuit sites
