= Admiral King (disambiguation) =

Ernest King (1878–1956) was a U.S. Navy Fleet Admiral. Admiral King may also refer to:

- Clyde King (rower) (1898–1982), U.S. Navy rear admiral
- Edward Durnford King (1771–1862), British Royal Navy admiral
- George King (Royal Navy officer) (1809–1891), British Royal Navy admiral
- Norman King (Royal Navy officer) (1933–2013), British Royal Navy vice admiral
- Phillip Parker King (1791–1856), British Royal Navy rear admiral
- Sir Richard King, 1st Baronet (1730–1806), British Royal Navy admiral
- Sir Richard King, 2nd Baronet (1774–1834), British Royal Navy vice admiral

== See also ==
- Admiral King-Hall (disambiguation)
