= Richard Hague =

American poet and writer (born 1947)

Richard Hague (born 1947) is an American poet and writer.

Born August 7, he was raised in Steubenville, Ohio, in Appalachian Ohio's Steel Valley, where he worked summers for Wheeling Steel and the Penn Central Railroad. He studied as a high school student at Northwestern University's Summer High School Journalism Institute and as an adult in Oxford, England on a six-week NEH Seminar. His BS and MA degrees in English are from Xavier University in Cincinnati. He continues to teach writing to adults and young people in Cincinnati. He is former Chair of the English Department at Purcell Marian High School where the Writing Program he designed and administered won the National First Prize in The English-Speaking Union "Excellence in English Award" in 1994.Since 2015 he has served as Writer-in-Residence at Thomas More College in Crestview Hills, Kentucky.

== Writing life ==
Hague was the 1982 Cincinnati Post-Corbett Award winner in Literary Arts. He has been a member of the staff of the Appalachian Writers Workshop in Hindman, Kentucky, most recently in 2004, The Augusta Writer's Roundtable in Augusta, Kentucky, the Midwest Writers Conference at Kent State University, The Highlands Summer Conference at Radford University in Virginia and was Literary Artist for the 1984 Kentucky Institute For Arts in Education at the University of Louisville. He was a Scholar in Creative nonfiction at the Bread Loaf Writer's Conference, and a Finalist in the Associated Writing Programs' Award in Creative Nonfiction. He was Featured Writer at the 2013 Emory & Henry Literary Festival at Emory & Henry College and his work and life were the subject of The Iron Mountain Review, Volume XXX. A long-time member of The Southern Appalachian Writers Cooperative, he is Editor Emeritus of Pine Mountain Sand & Gravel, an annual anthology of contemporary Appalachian writing. From 2015 to 2018, he served as Writer-in-Residence at Thomas More College, Crestview Hills, Kentucky.

== Publications ==
His collections of poems include Ripening (Ohio State University Press, 1984) for which he was named Ohio Co-Poet of the Year in 1985, Possible Debris (Cleveland State University Poetry Center, 1988), Mill and Smoke Marrow, appearing in the four-book collection A Red Shadow of Steel Mills (Bottom Dog Press, 1991), Garden (Word Press 2002), Alive in Hard Country (Bottom Dog Press, 2003) and named 2004 Poetry Book of the Year by the Appalachian Writers Association, The Time It Takes Light (Word Press, 2004), and Lives of The Poem (Wind Publications, 2005), as well as five chapbooks, Crossings, A Week of Nights Down River, A Bestiary, Greatest Hits: 1968–2000, and Burst: Poems Quickly (Dos Madres Press, 2004). Milltown Natural: Essays And Stories from A Life (Bottom Dog Press, 1997) was a 1997 National Book Award nominee. More recently, he has published Public Hearings (Word Press, 2009), Learning How: Stories, Yarns, & Tales (Bottom Dog Press, 2011), During The Recent Extinctions: New & Selected Poems (Dos Madres Press, 2012) and winner of the Weatherford Award in Poetry, Where Drunk Men Go (Dos Madres Press, 2015), Beasts, River, Drunk Men, Garden, Burst & Light: Sequences and Long Poems (Dos Madres Press, 2016), and Studied Days: Poems Early & Late in Appalachia (Dos Madres Press, 2017).

== Credits ==
His poems, essays, and stories have appeared in many magazines and reviews and in over two dozen anthologies. He is a recipient of grants and fellowships from The Greater Cincinnati Foundation, The Council for Basic Education, The Southern Poverty Law Center, the Marianist Education Consortium, and three Ohio Arts Council Individual Artists Fellowships in two genres. He won the $1,000 First Prize in the year 1999's Sow's Ear Poetry Review contest, and was, for the second time, a Finalist in the 1999 Pablo Neruda Prize for Poetry, sponsored by Nimrod: International Journal. He is winner of the James Still Short Fiction Award for 2004, sponsored by Wind: A Journal of Writing & Community, and judged by novelist and short story writer Lee Smith (Oral History, Fair And Tender Ladies, The Last Girls). Smith writes of Hague's "Fivethree Filson and the Looking Business." This is a wildly original story in the great American tradition of the tall tale, by a writer who's clearly punch-drunk on language. Dickensian in scope, this exuberant story is both literary and wildly entertaining." He also sits on the board of Ink Tank in Cincinnati.

== Awards ==
Hague received the 1982 Cincinnati Post-Corbett Award in Literary Arts, and his performance piece, "Where Drunk Men Go" won Critic's Choice in the 2009 Cincinnati Fringe Festival. Richard Hague was twice named Master Teacher by the Faculty at Purcell Marian High school and was the 2003 Teacher of the Year as voted by the Senior Class. He also received the school's Praestans Award in 2007. His book During the Recent Extinctions: New and Selected Poems 1984-2012 won the 2012 Weatherford Award for Poetry. He has presented professionally at the National Council of Teachers of English, the Ohio Council of Teachers of English and Language Arts, and the Ohio Catholic Education Association.

== Personal life ==
Richard Hague lives in Cincinnati's Madisonville neighborhood with his wife Pam Korte, a potter and Assistant Professor of Ceramics at The College of Mt. St. Joseph, and his two sons, Patrick, an alumnus of Indiana University, and Brendan, a graduate of Purcell Marian High School.
