= Norman Finkelstein (poet) =

American poet and literary critic

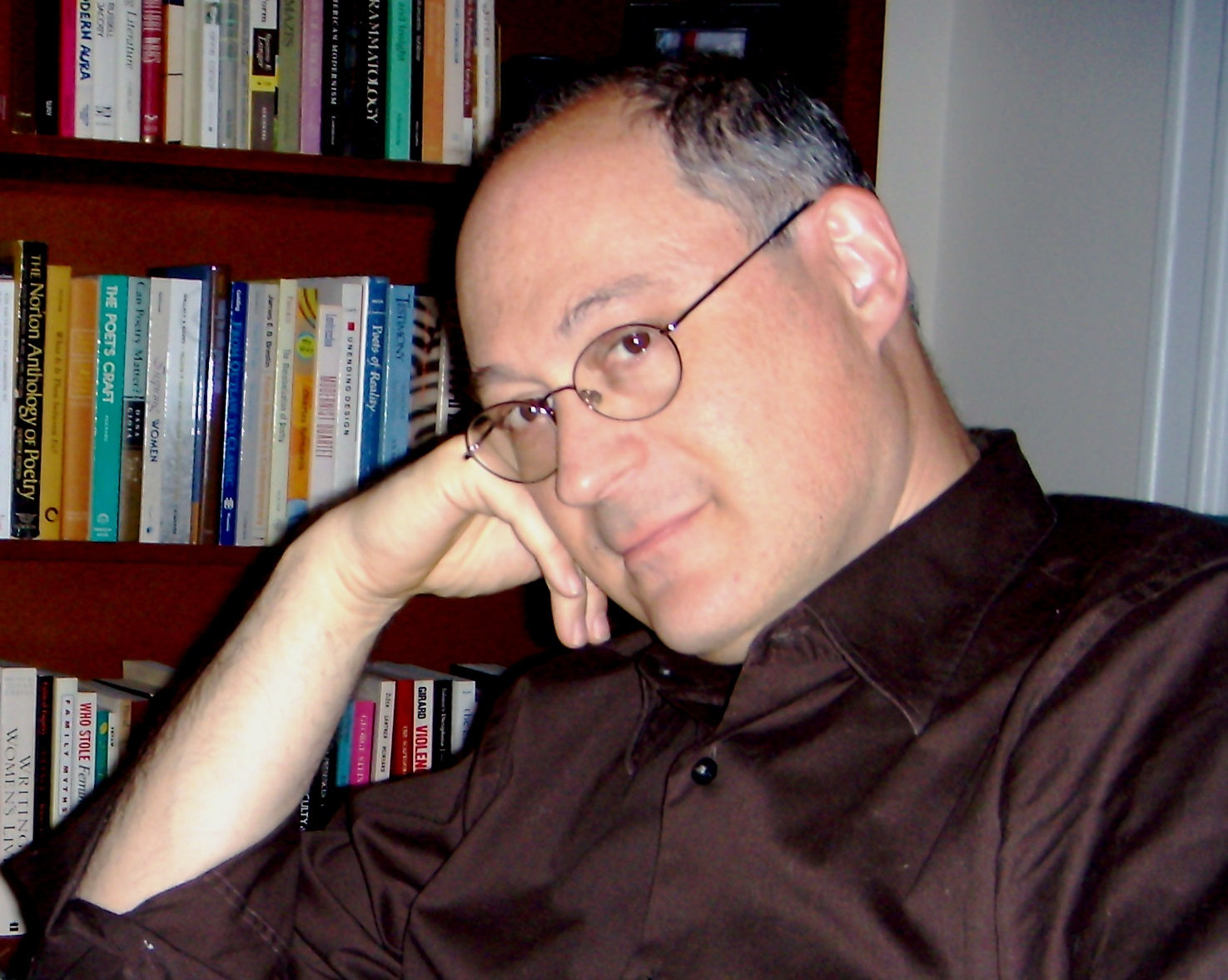
Norman Finkelstein

Norman Finkelstein (born 1954) is an American poet and literary critic. He has written extensively about modern and postmodern poetry and about Jewish American literature. According to Tablet Magazine, Finkelstein's poetry "is simultaneously secular and religious, stately and conversational, prophetic, and circumspect."

Finkelstein was born in New York City. He earned his B.A. from Binghamton University and his Ph.D. from Emory University. He was a Professor of English at Xavier University in Cincinnati, Ohio, retiring in April 2020.

== Books of poetry ==
- The Objects In Your Life (House of Keys, Atlanta, 1977)
- Restless Messengers (Georgia, 1992)
- Track: three volumes. Track (Spuyten Duyvil, 1999), Columns (Spuyten Duyvil, 2002), and Powers (Spuyten Duyvil, 2005)
- Passing Over (Marsh Hawk Press, 2007)
- Scribe (Dos Madres Press, 2009)
- Inside the Ghost Factory (Marsh Hawk Press, 2010)
- Track (complete poem in one volume, Shearsman Books, 2012)

== Books of literary criticism ==
- The Utopian Moment in Contemporary American Literature (Bucknell, 1988, 1993)
- The Ritual of New Creation: Jewish Tradition and Contemporary Literature (SUNY, 1992)
- Not One of Them In Place: Modern Poetry and Jewish American Identity (SUNY, 2002)
- Lyrical Interference: Essays on Poetics (Spuyten Duyvil, 2004)
- On Mount Vision: Forms of the Sacred In Contemporary American Poetry (Iowa, 2010)
