= Michael Heller (poet) =

American poet

Michael D. Heller (born May 11, 1937) is an American poet, essayist and critic. Heller himself notes that:

there is no question that the tenor of contemporary civilization is marked by its uncertainty, its hesitant mood on matters both cultural and political. Poetry, ever sensitive to the nuances of its surroundings, must limn or bode forth the environmental conditions out of which it arises. That poets, those presumed antennae of the race, might be picking up the signals and putting them somehow into the work seems only too obvious.

== Selected publications ==
- Accidental Center (Sumac Press, 1972); poetry
- Knowledge (1980); poetry
- Conviction's Net of Branches: Essays on the Objectivist Poets and Poetry (Southern Illinois University Press, 1985); criticism
- In the Builded Place (Coffee House Press, 1989); poetry
- Carl Rakosi: Man and Poet (Orono, ME: National Poetry Foundation, 1993); Heller is editor of this volume on the renowned Objectivist poet
- Wordflow: New and Selected Poems (Talisman House, 1997); poetry
- Living Root: A Memoir (SUNY Press, 2000); memoir of his youth in Brooklyn and Miami Beach, FL, that mixes in history regarding his family's hometown of Bialystock, Poland, and World War II
- Exigent Futures: New and Selected Poems (Salt Publishing, 2003); poetry: gathers together poems from four of his major collections
- Uncertain Poetries : Selected Essays on Poets, Poetry and Poetics (Salt Publishing, 2005); essays
- Earth and Cave, (Loveland, OH: Dos Madres Press, 2006) ISBN 9781933675176
- A Look at the Door with the Hinges Off, (Loveland, OH: Dos Madres Press, 2006) ISBN 1-933675-11-X
- Speaking the Estranged: Essays on the Work of George Oppen, (Cambridge UK: Salt Publishing, 2008); essay/memoir
- Eschaton, (Jersey City, NJ: Talisman House, 2009)
- Dianoia, (Brooklyn, NY: Nightboat Books, 2016)
- Telescope: Selected Poems, (New York, NY: NYRB Poets, 2019)
