= Manuel Iris =

Mexican-American writer

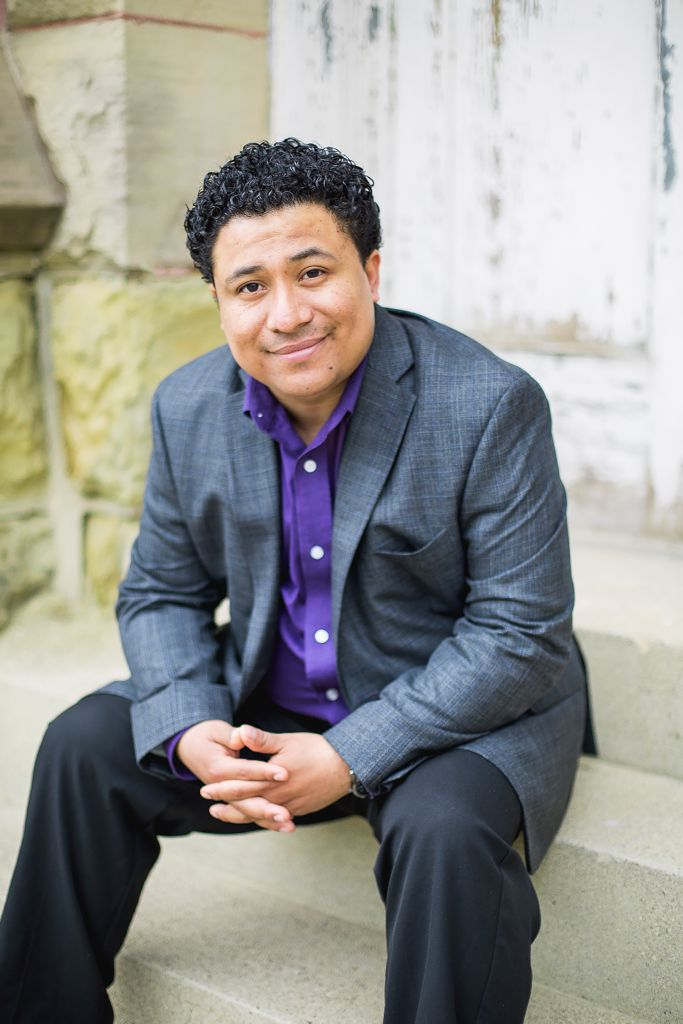
- Born: 1983 (age 42–43); Campeche City, Campeche
- Citizenship: Mexican
- Education: Autonomous University of Yucatan New Mexico State University University of Cincinnati
- Occupations: Poet and educator
- Honours: Poet Laureate of the City of Cincinnati, Ohio, 2018-2020. Incorporated into the National System of Art Creators (SNCA) of Mexico, 2021.

Manuel Iris (born 1983) is a Mexican-born American poet, writer, and educator.

He was the Poet Laureate of the City of Cincinnati, Ohio, from 2018 to 2020. In 2021, he was inducted into the National System of Art Creators (SNCA) of Mexico, in the discipline of poetry. He has published ten collections of poems in Spanish and English.

== Biography ==
He began his career as a writer in the workshops of Joaquín Bestard Vázquez at the Autonomous University of Yucatan (UADY). He has collaborated in online and print publications such as La Otra Revista, Letras Libres, Periodico de Poesia, Altazor Magazine, Post Road Magazine, and The Journal.

== Awards and honours ==
In 2009, he won the Merida National Poetry Prize for his book Cuaderno de los Sueños, and in 2014 he received the Rodulfo Figueroa Regional Poetry Prize awarded by the state of Chiapas, for Los disfraces del fuego. Additionally, in 2018, he won recognition in the categories of best book of poems and best translation at the International Latino Book Awards, in Los Angeles, California, with his first bilingual anthology Traducir el silencio / Translating Silence.

In 2022, his book The parting present/Lo que se irá was the winner of the Reader’s Choice Award at the Ohioana Book Awards, and a recognition at the International Latino Book Awards 2022.

In 2025, his manuscript, Toda la tierra es un jardín de monstruos / The Whole Earth Is a Garden of Monsters, co-translated by Iris and Kevin McHugh, was selected by the Academy of American Poets as the winner of the Ambroggio Prize.

== Works ==
=== Poems ===
- Cuaderno de los sueños (2009)
- Los disfraces del fuego (2014)
- La luz desnuda, antología personal (2016)
- Frente al misterio (2016)
- Cincinnati, historia personal (2018)
- Overnight Medley (2018)
- Traducir el silencio / Translating Silence (2018)
- Devocionario (2020)
- Lo que se irá (2021)
- The parting present / Lo que se irá (2021)

=== Anthologies ===
- Postal de Oleaje: poetas mexicanos y colombianos nacidos en los 80 (2013)
- Espejo de doble filo: antología de poesía sobre la violencia México-Colombia (2014)
- Casi una isla: nueve poetas yucatecos nacidos en la década de 1980 (2015)
- Voces de América Latina (2016)
- Antología de la poesía iberoamericana actual (2018)
