= Mario Markus =

Chilean physicist

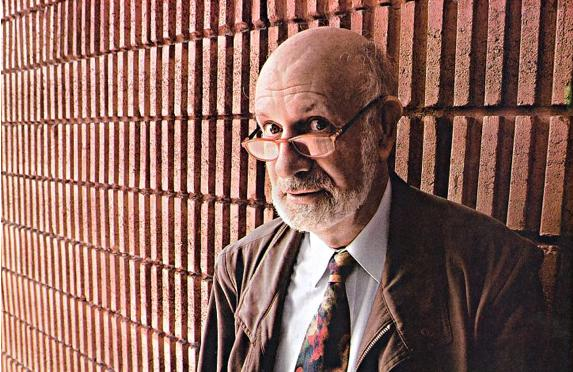
Markus at the Max Planck Institute for Molecular Physiology in Dortmund

Mario Markus (born 29 July 1944) is a German-Chilean physicist who worked in the Max Planck Institute for Molecular Physiology in Dortmund. In addition to his scientific work, Markus has exhibited his own computer graphics, as well as written novels, poetry, and translated Spanish poems.

== Biography ==
In 1970 he obtained his physics diploma under Konrad Tamm at the Institute for Applied Physics at the University of Heidelberg with a thesis on the Pinch-Effekt in plasmas made up of electrons and holes in semiconductors. From March 1970 to 1973 he conducted research for his doctorate on instabilities in plasmas at this institute. At the beginning of 1973 he received his doctorate (Dr. rer. nat.). After working as an assistant at the Institute for Theoretical Physics at the University of Heidelberg, he moved to the Max Planck Institute for Biophysics in Frankfurt am Main in April 1974. From January 1975 he was a research associate at the former Max Planck Institute (MPI) for Nutritional Physiology (today's MPI for Molecular Physiology) in Dortmund in the department of the biochemist and biophysicist Benno Hess. In 1988 he habilitated at the University of Dortmund, where he was first appointed a lecturer and then, in August 1997, an associate professor.

In addition to his scientific work, he has published several volumes of poetry, a novel, a comic and works on computer graphics.

== Works on computer graphics ==
Since the 1980s, Markus has created numerous works and presented exhibitions with computer graphics based on his novel representation of Lyapunov fractals, also called Ljapunow exponents, Lyapunow diagrams, Ljapunow fractals or Markus- Ljapunov diagrams. It should be noted, however, that many of these representations do not meet the mathematical definition of fractals, in which sections are similar or equal to the overall picture. In 2009 he published a comprehensive book on that subject with a CD-ROM for the reader to create such graphics: the German book “Die Kunst der Mathematik” (The Art of Mathematics), which was also published in Spanish. Below are some examples of Markus Ljapunov diagrams that appear in that book.

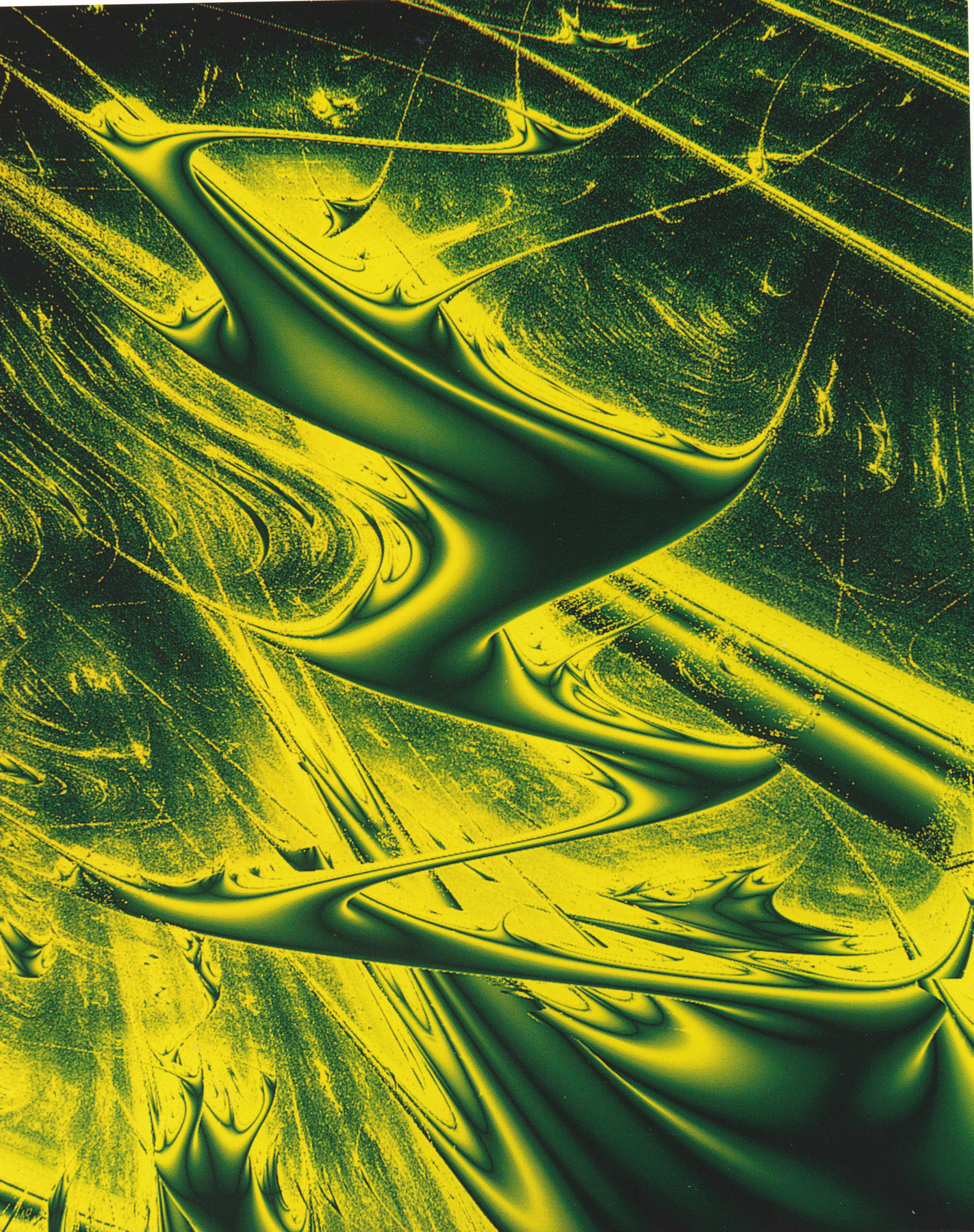

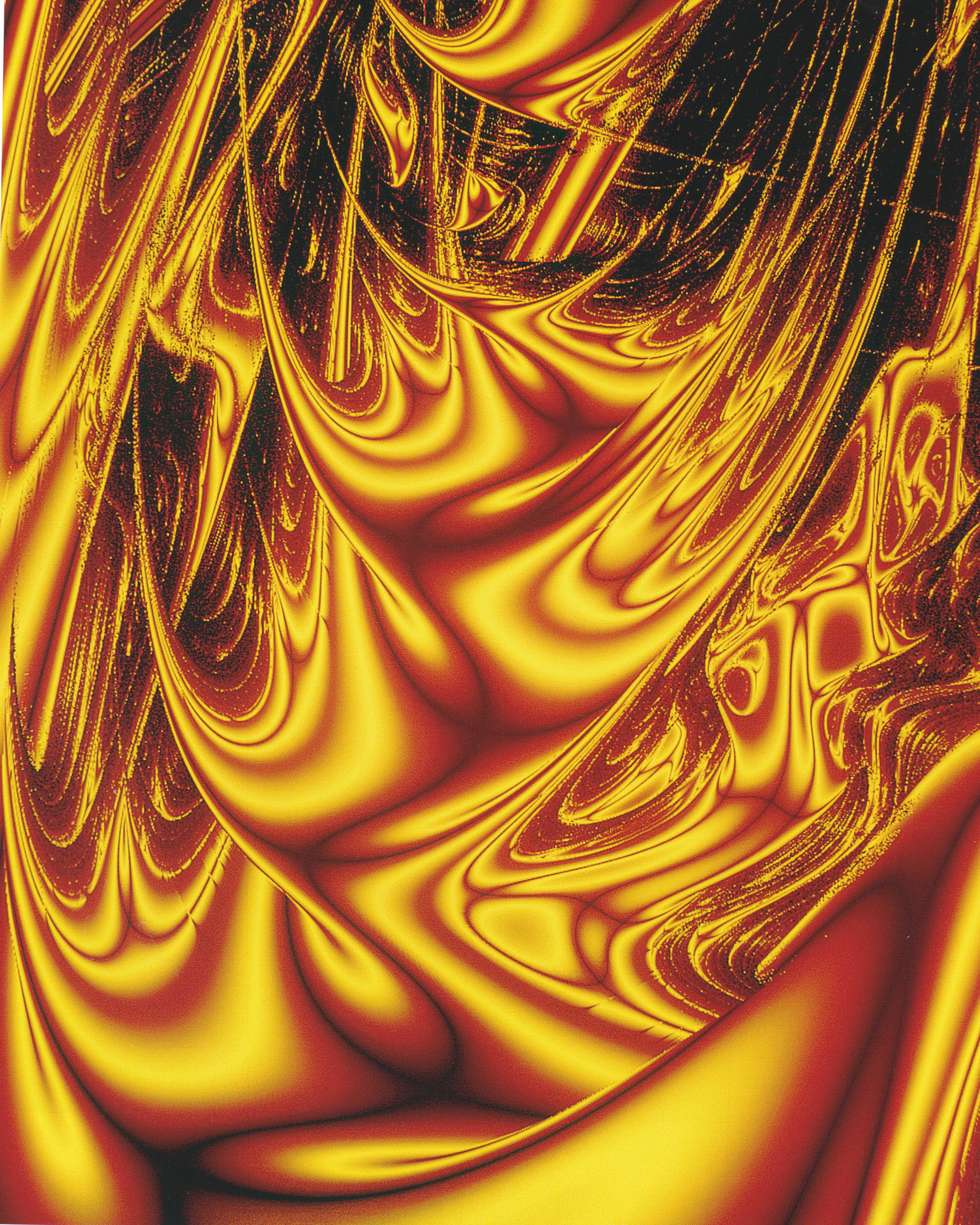

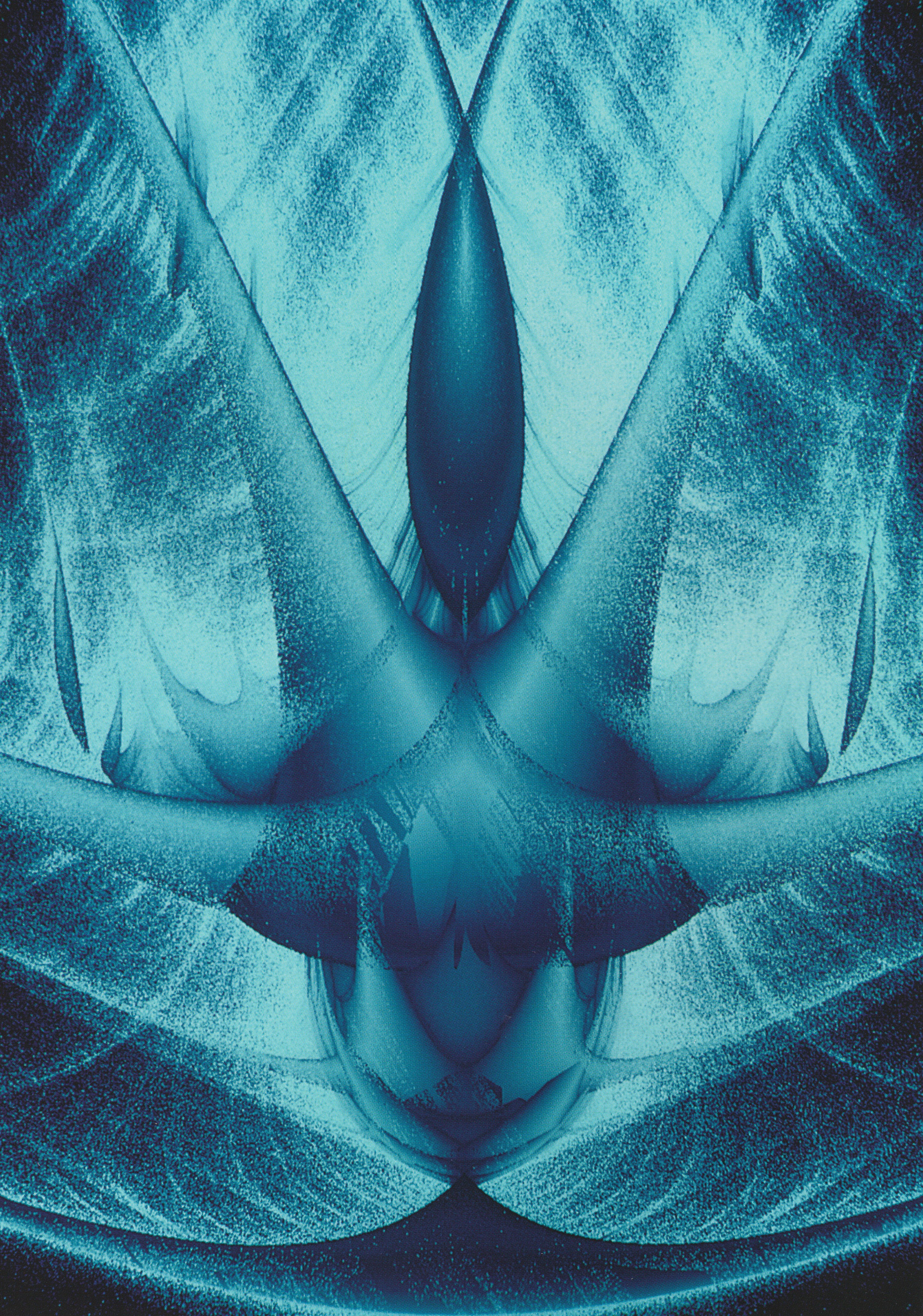

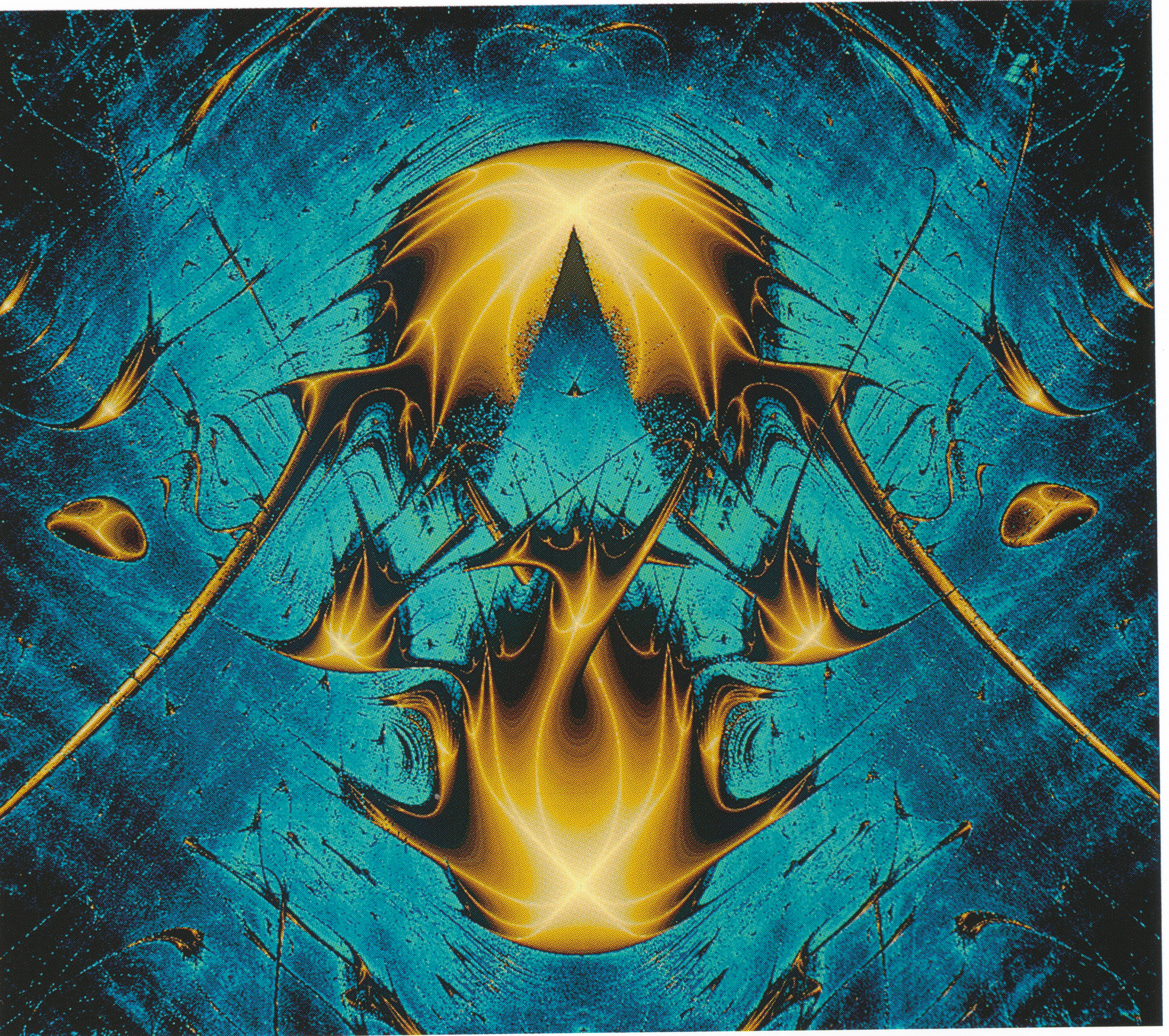

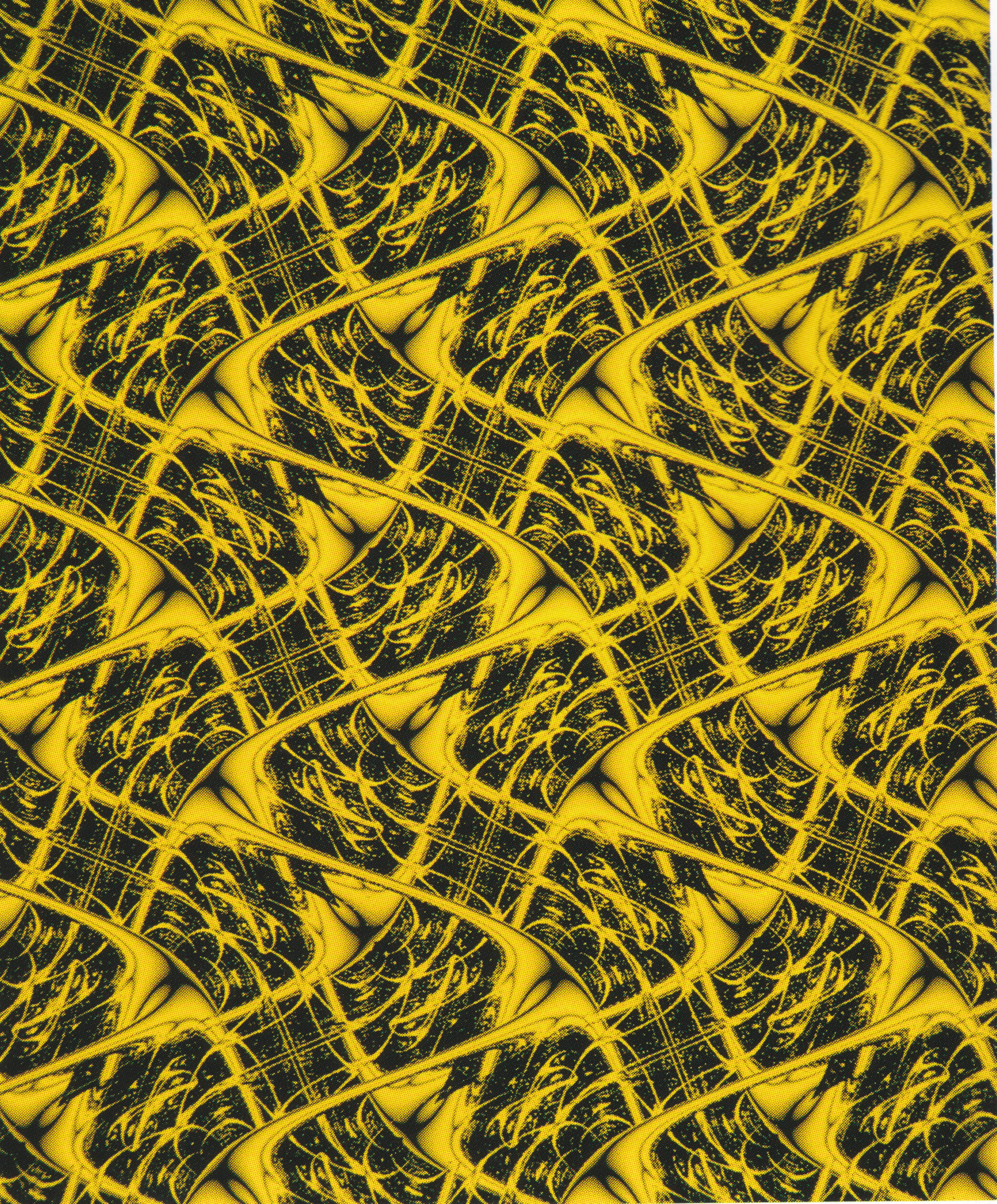

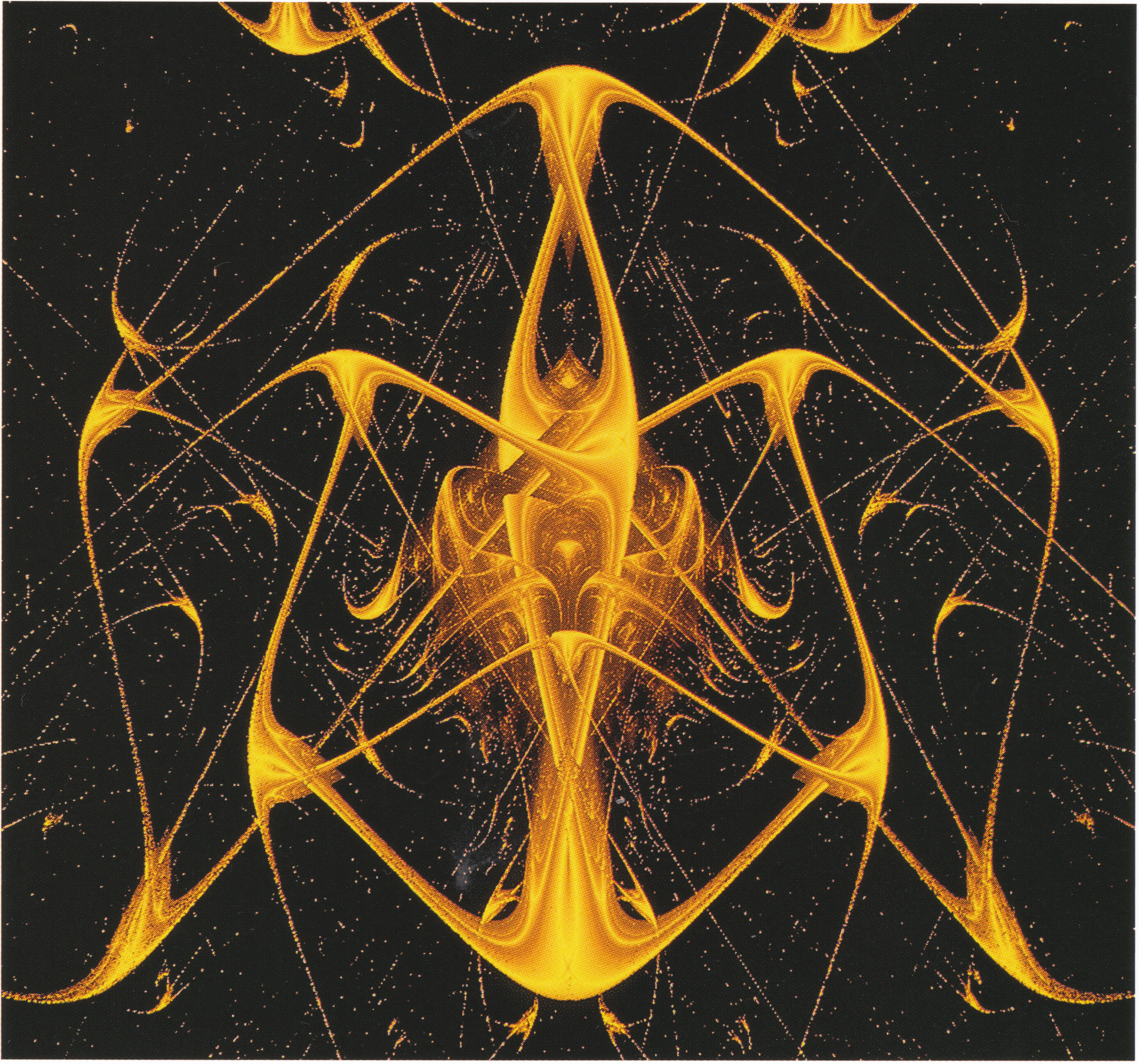

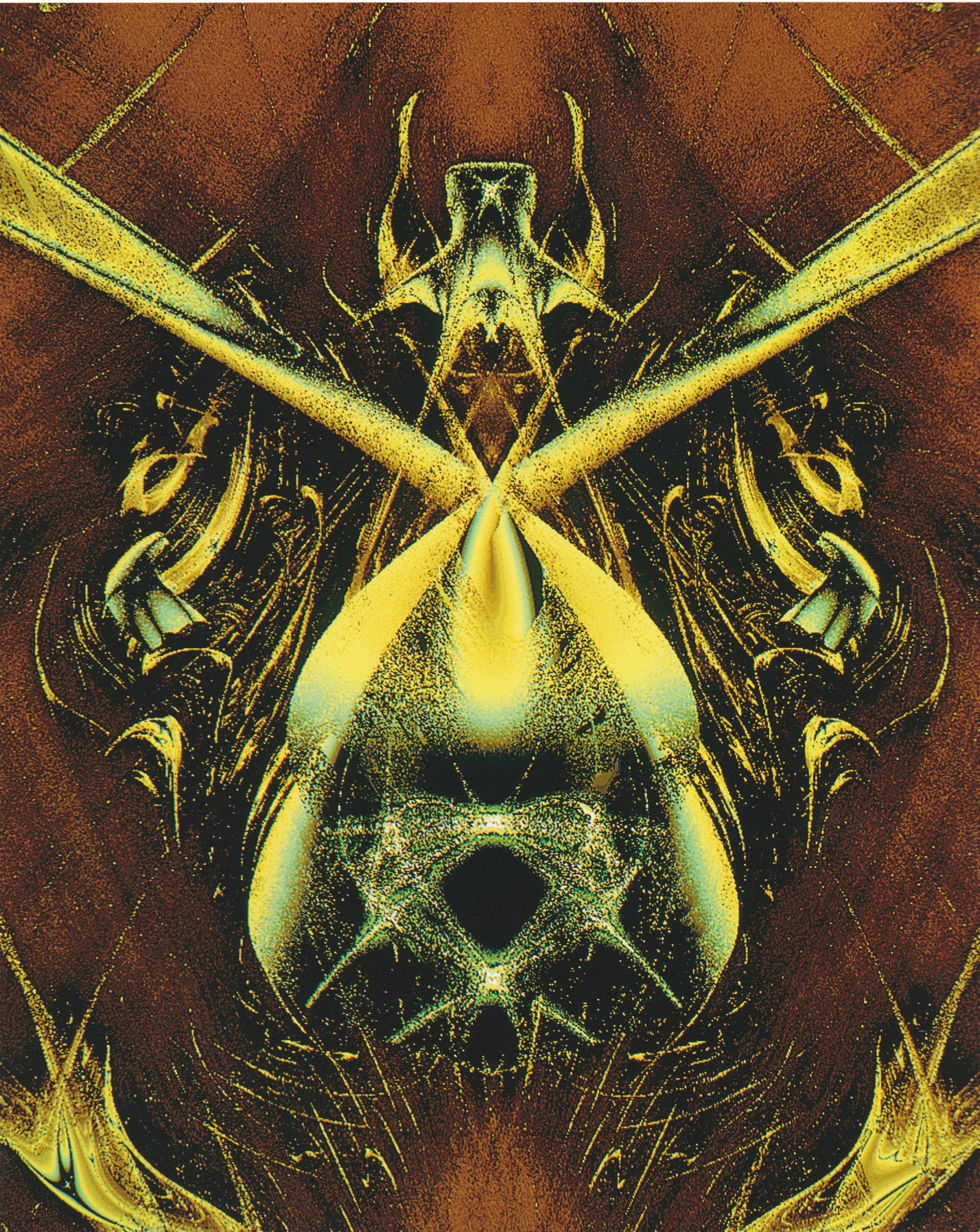

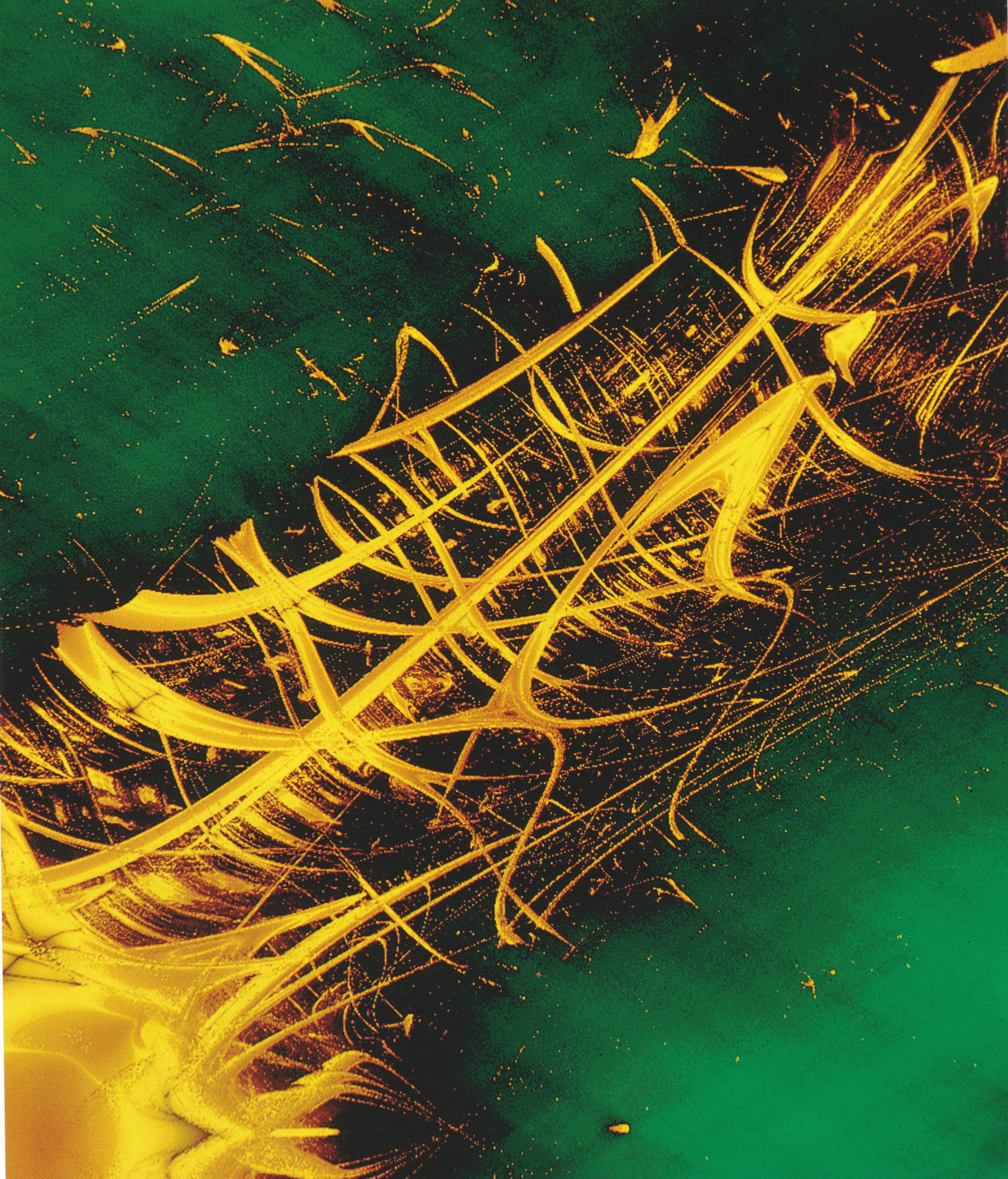

== Major contributions ==
- First evidence of a chaotic biological clock
- Development of a cellular automaton for the rapid calculation of waves in excitable media, e.g. in the heart muscle and in other structures
- First evidence of turbulence in a chemical reaction
- Universal cellular automaton for calculating patterns on mussels and snails
- Simple experimental proof of double diffusive convection. This phenomenon predicts the impossibiliy of using drinking water from towed icebergs
- Modeling the periodic return of cicadas after a prime number of years
- Process for the complete separation of particles of different sizes by shaking

== 2D Crystals ==
Markus discovered and described in detail a special type of crystals. These are 2D crystals, which are formed when microscope slides are wetted with a hydrophilic substance and allowed to dry. A drop of a chemical solution spontaneously spreads over the entire slide and crystallizes in a form that is completely different from known 3D crystals or monomolecular 2D crystals. Examples of Markus’ 2D crystals are shown here below.

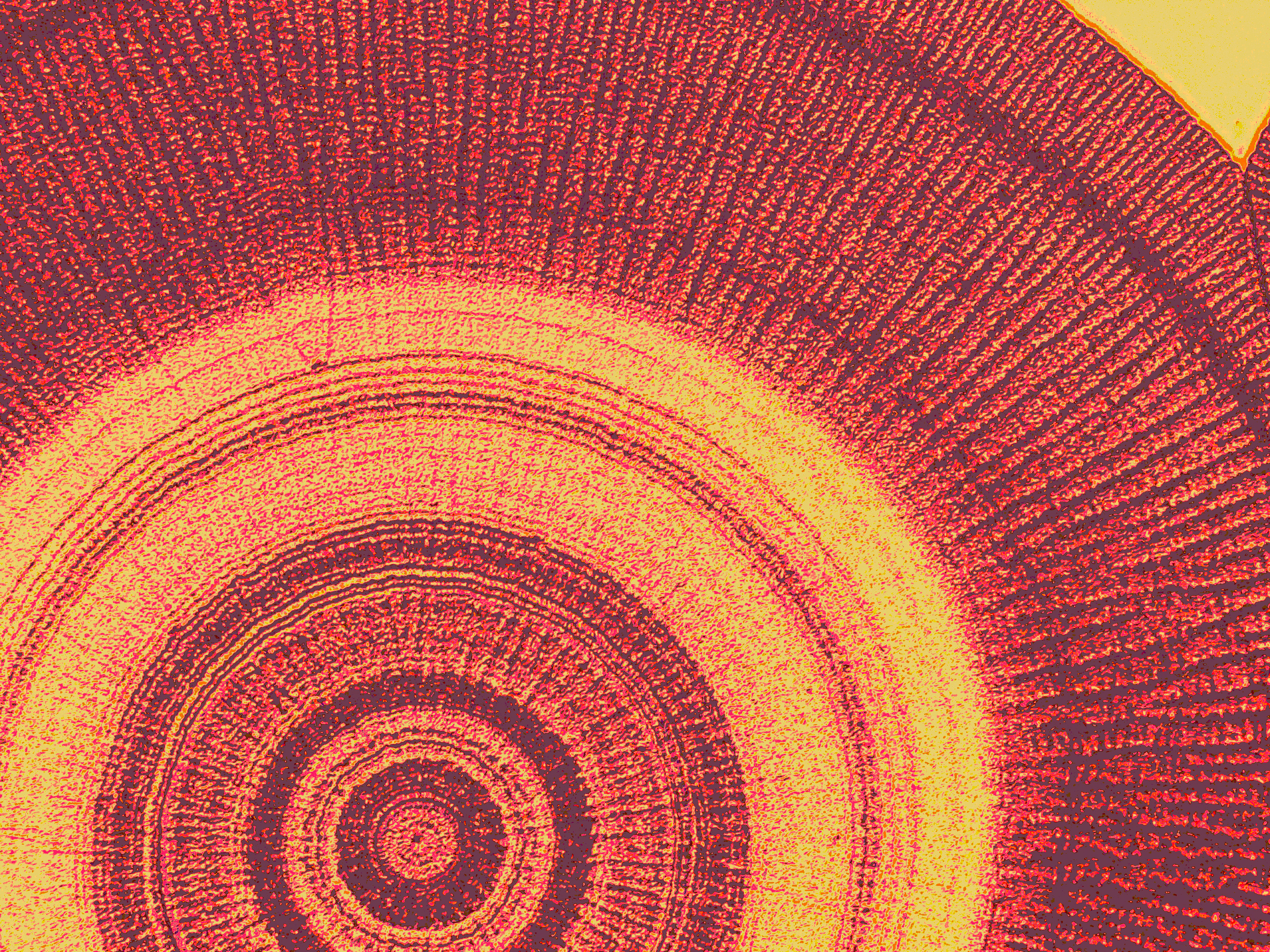

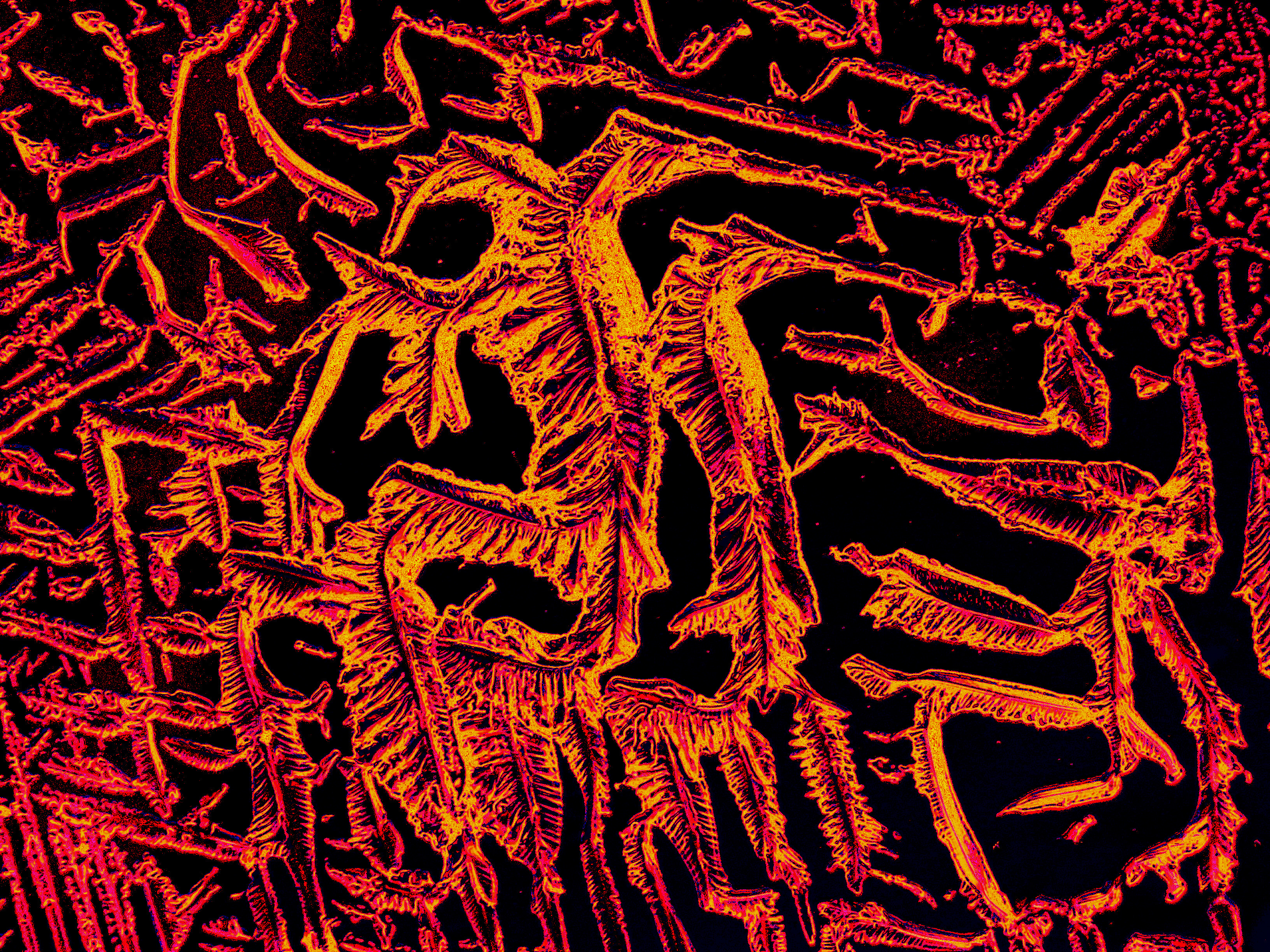

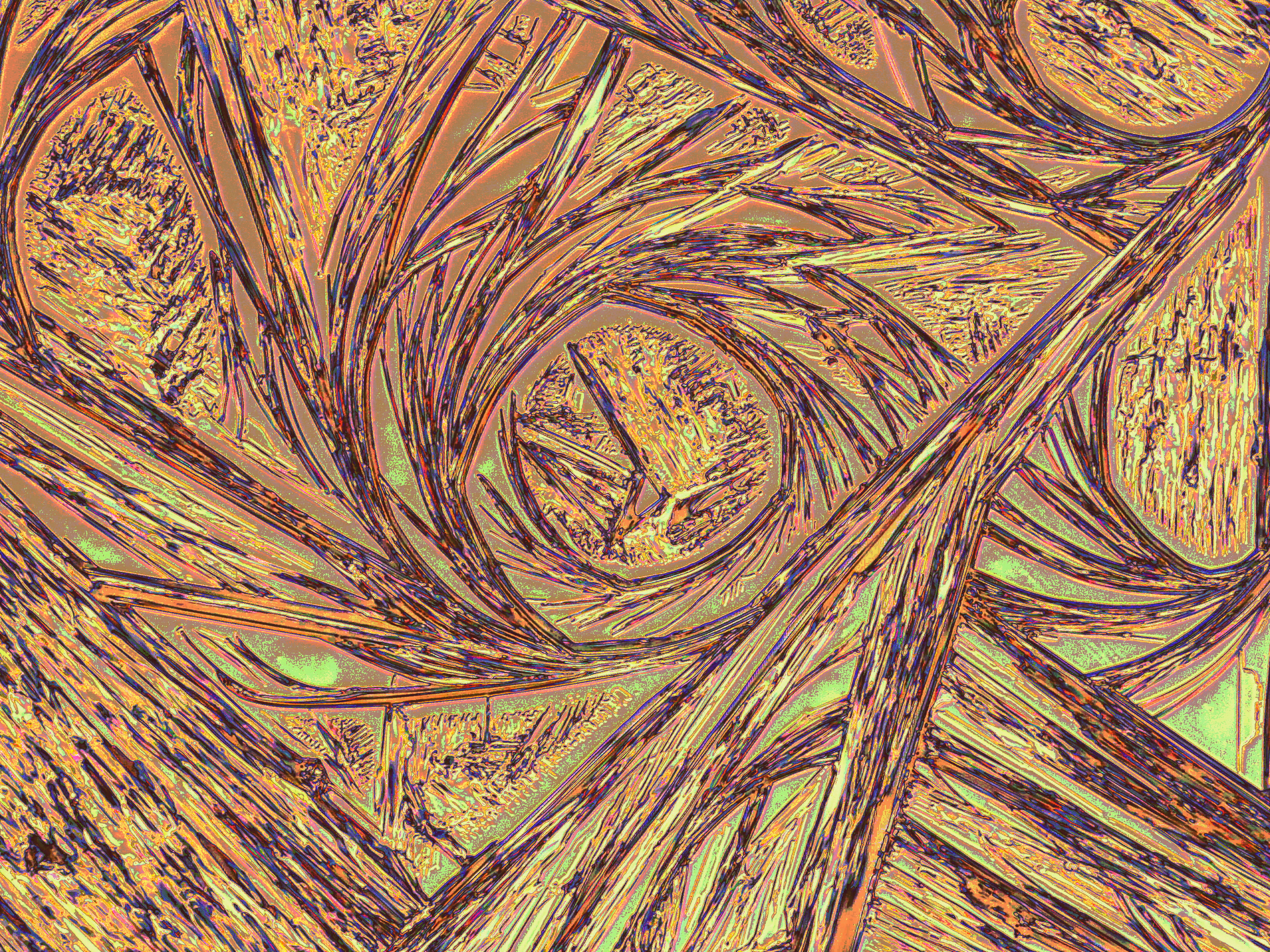

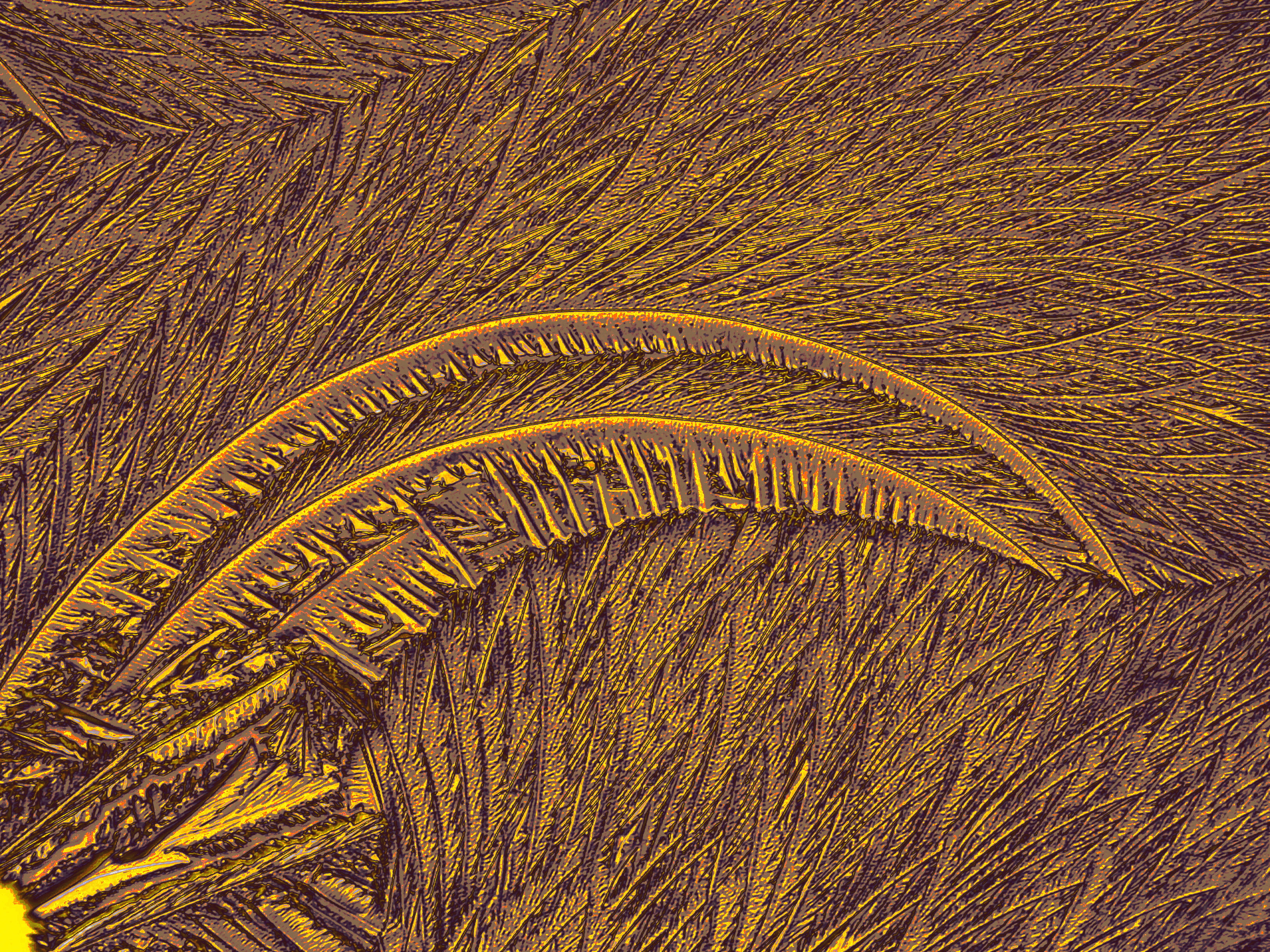

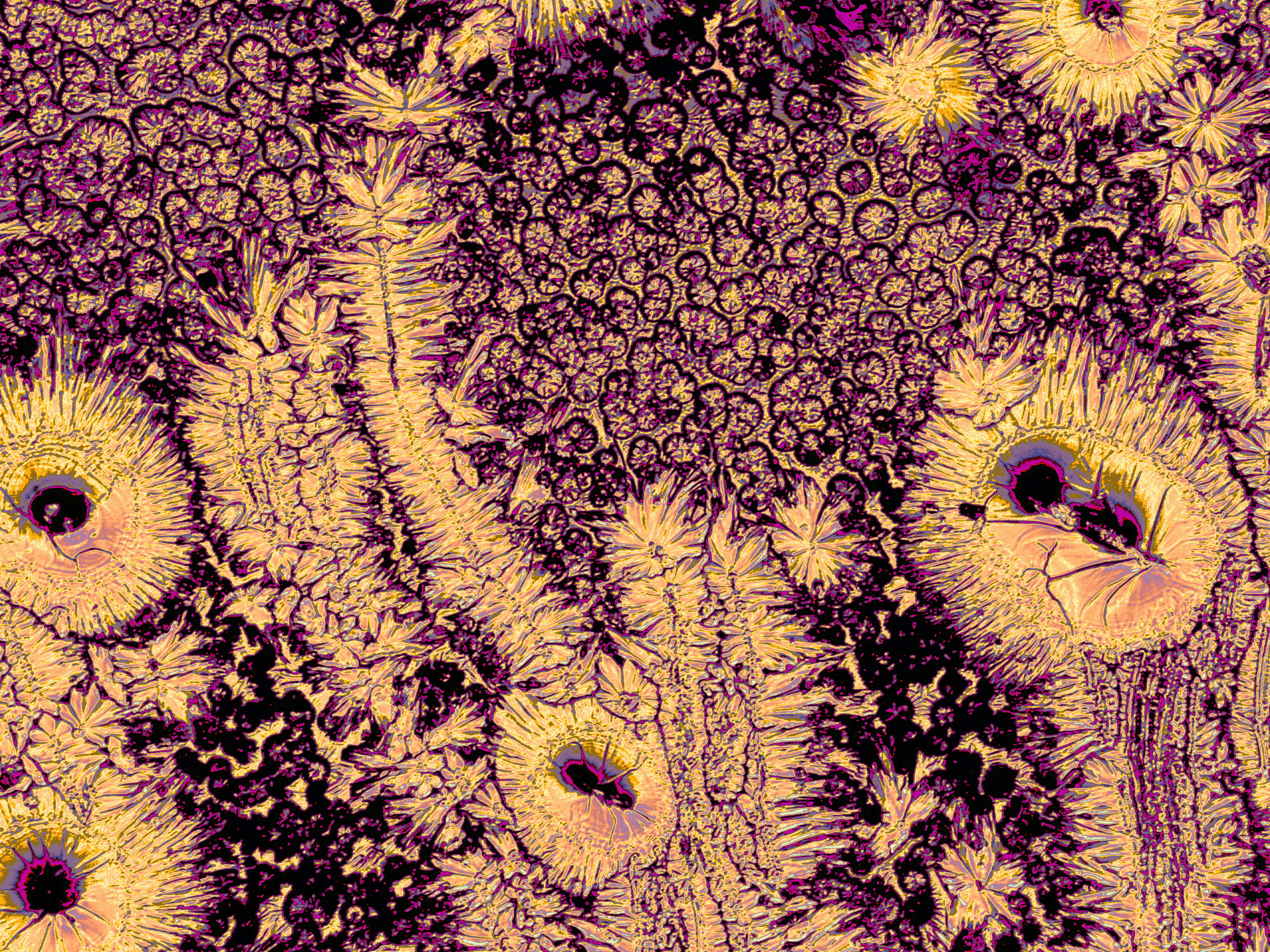

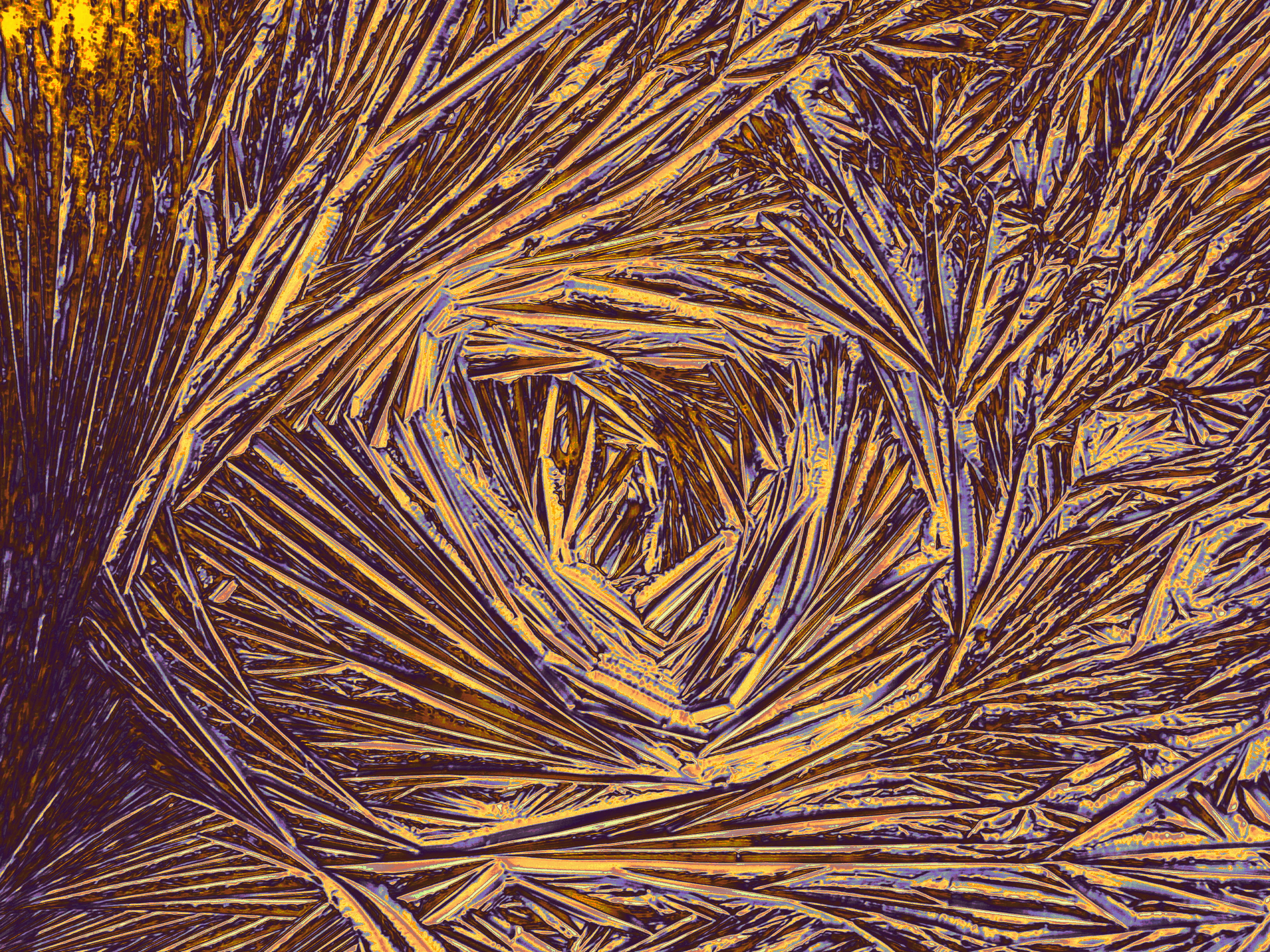

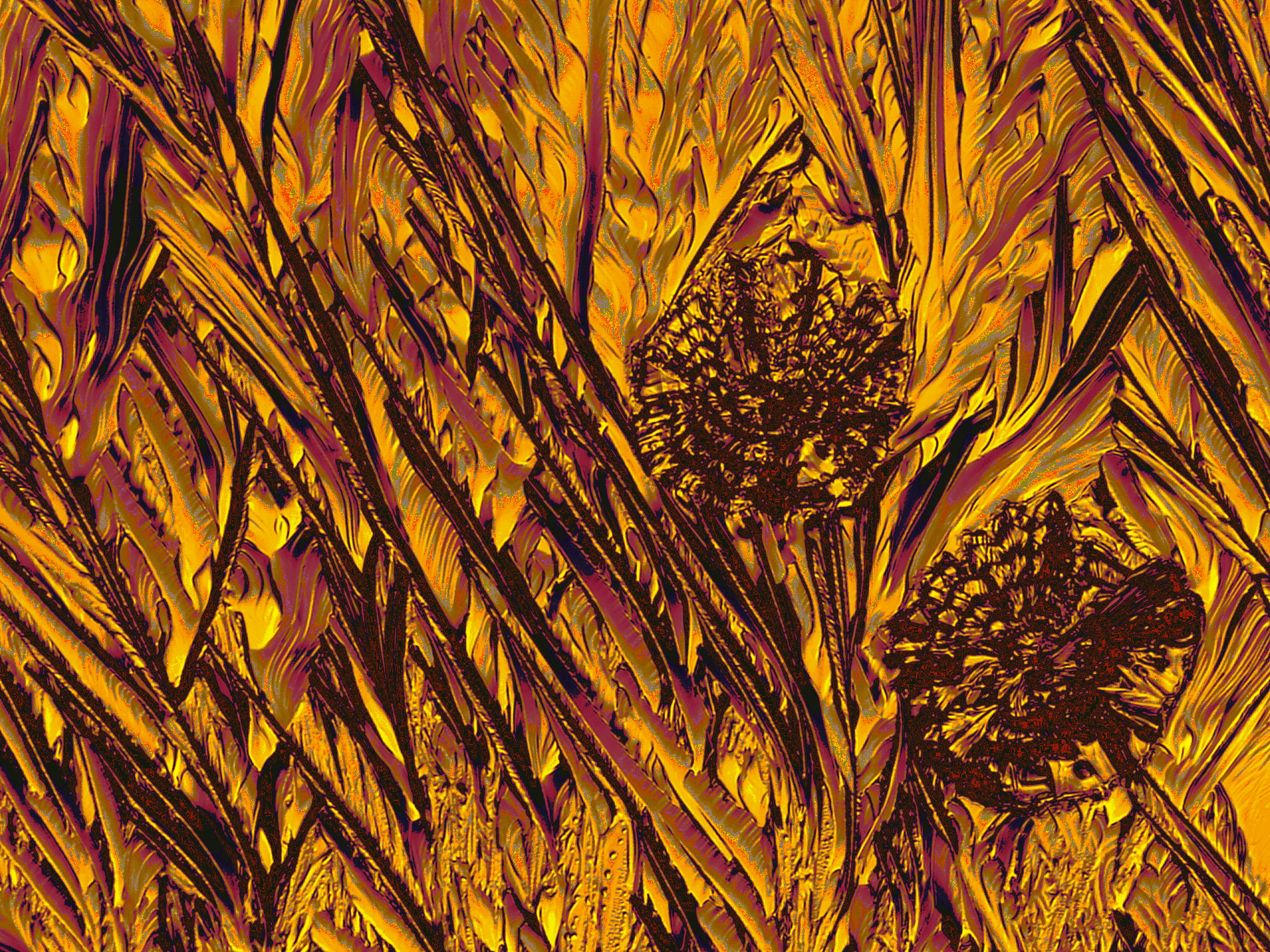

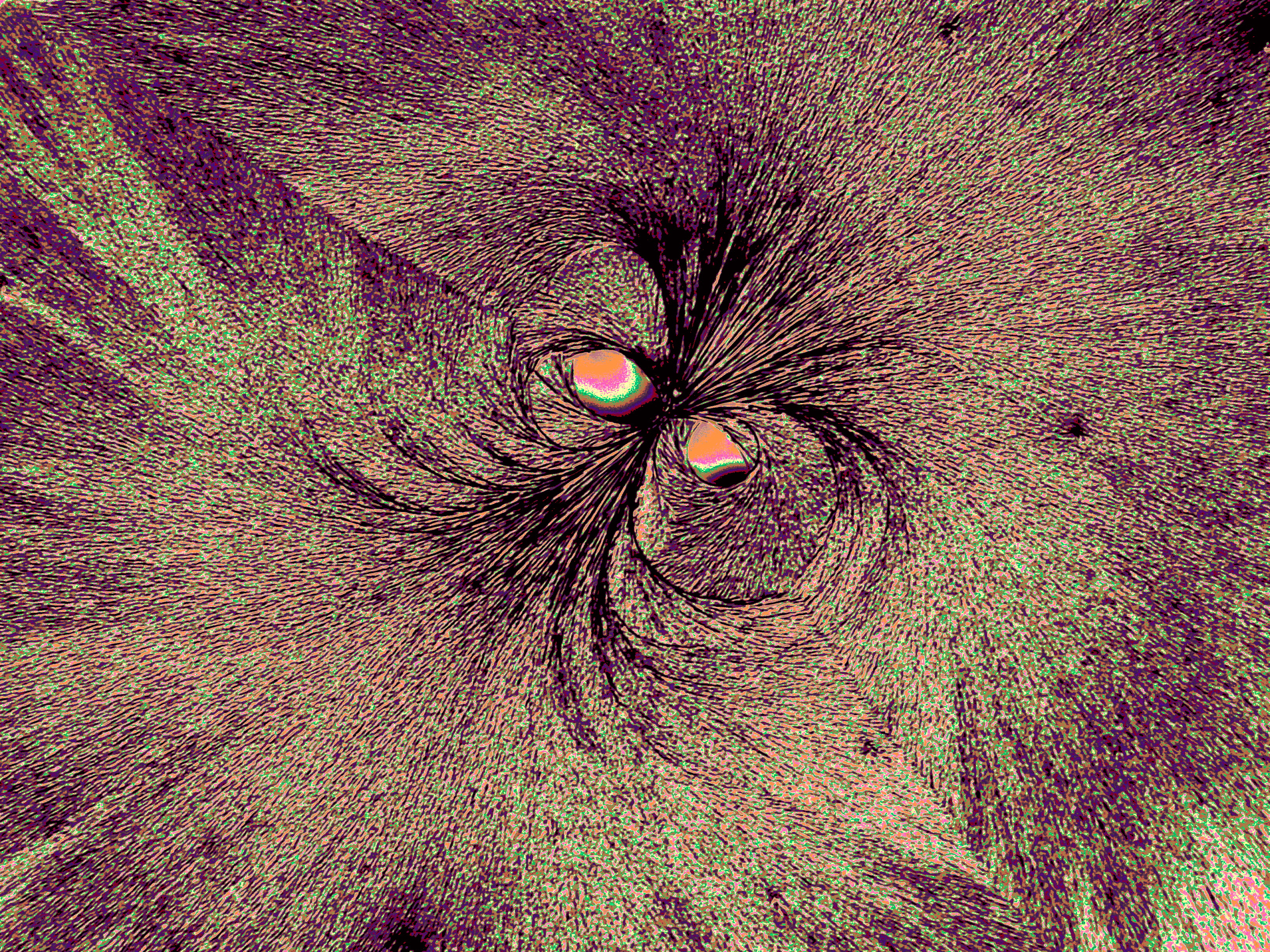

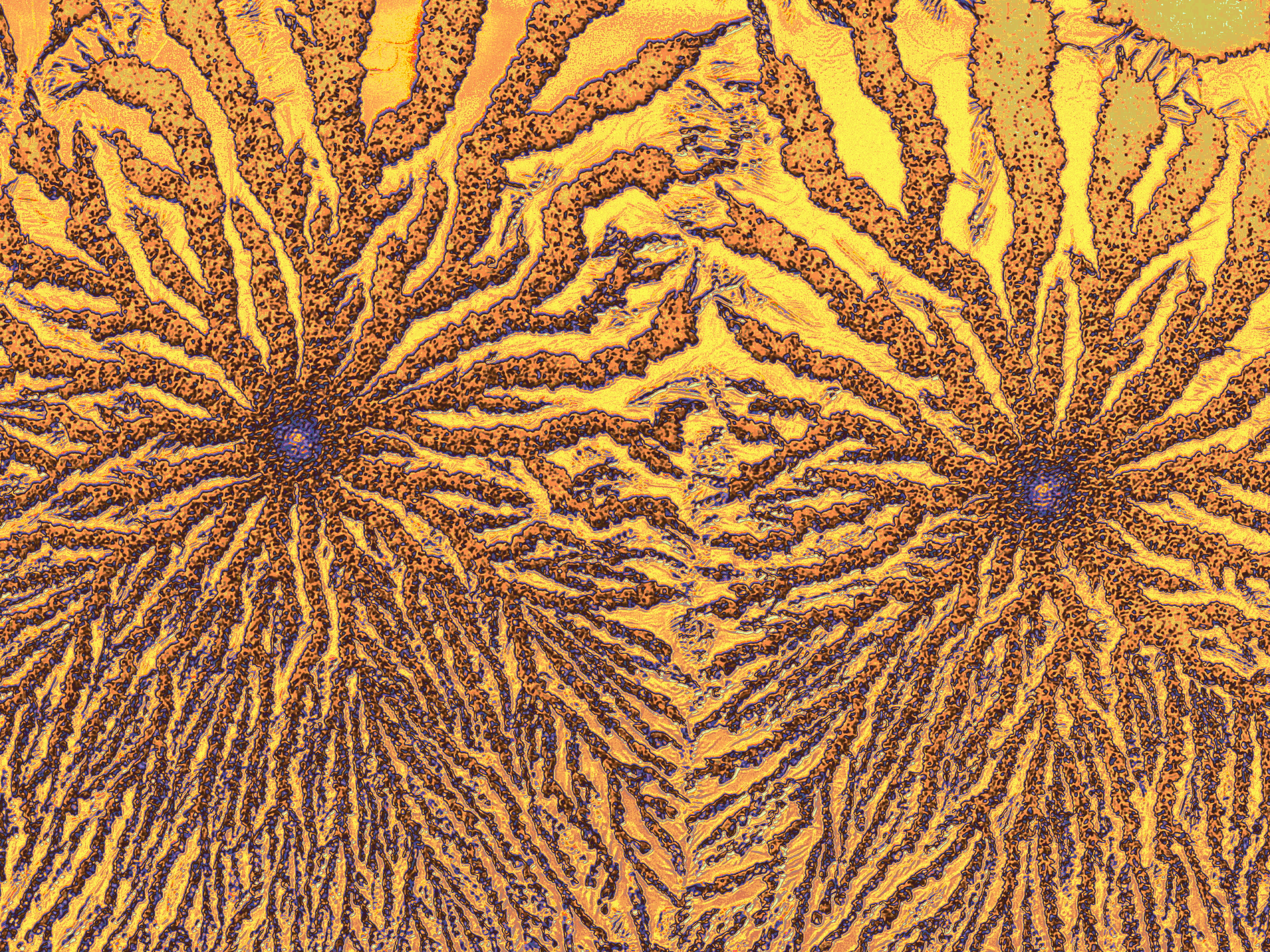

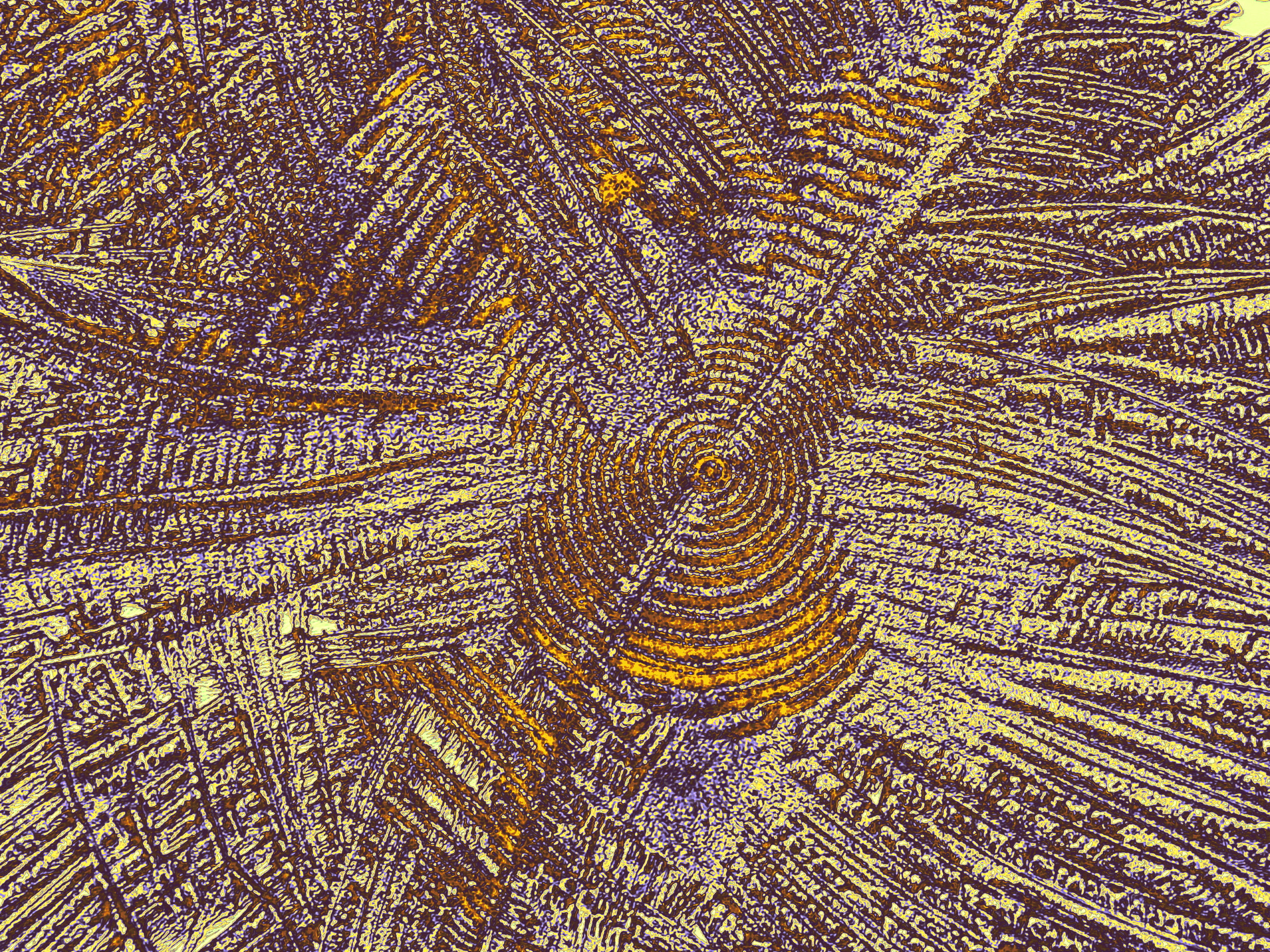

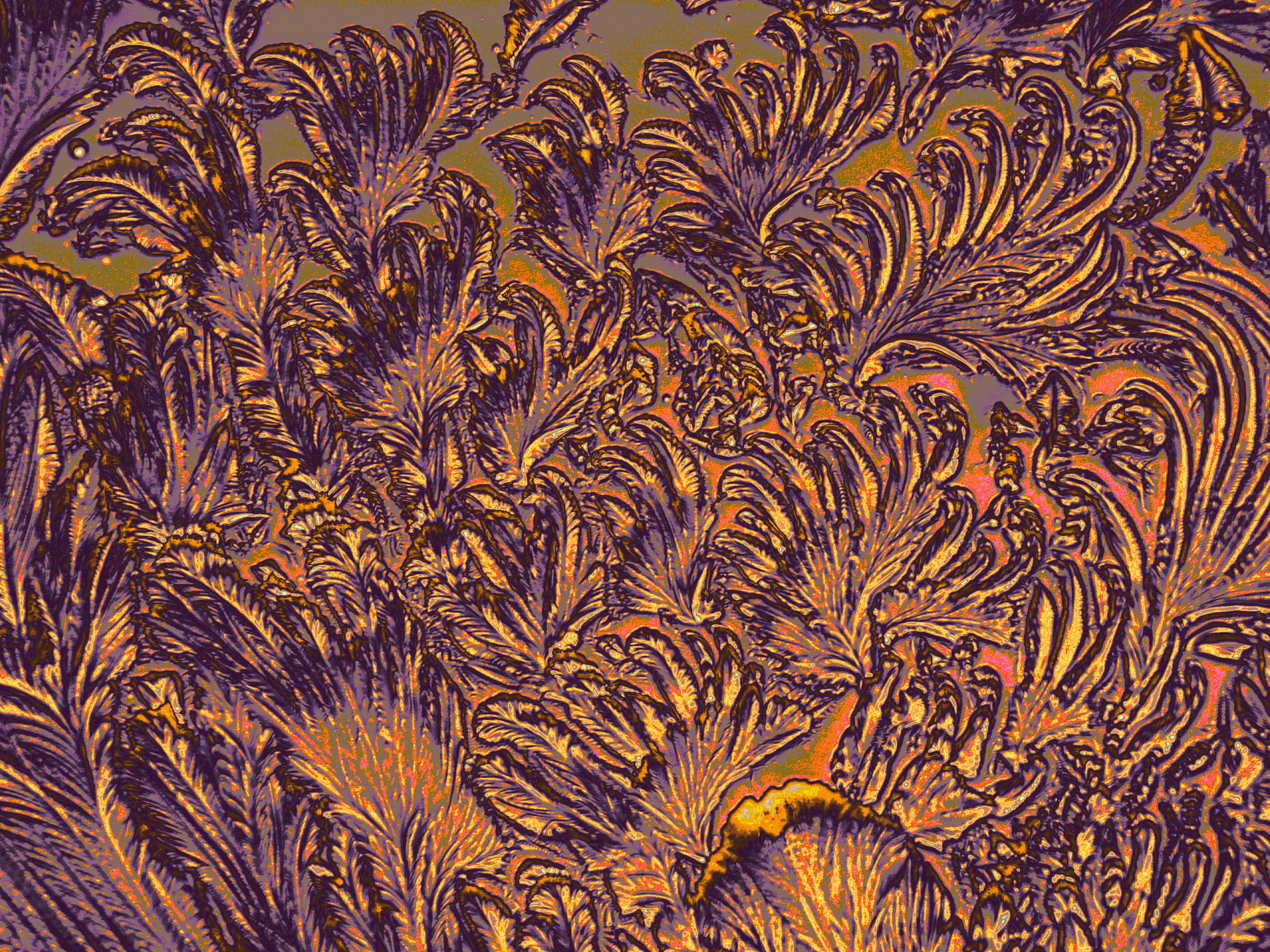

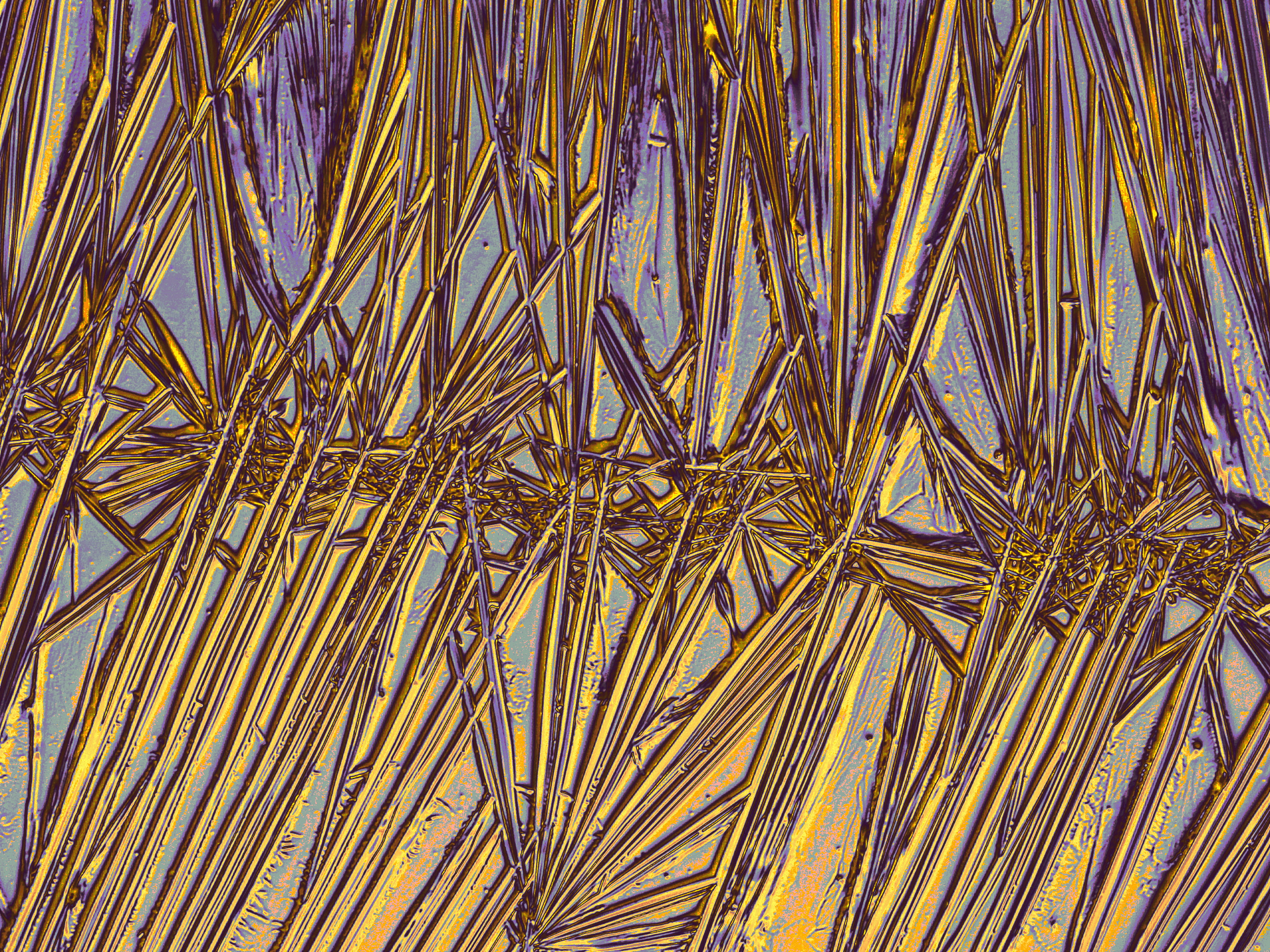

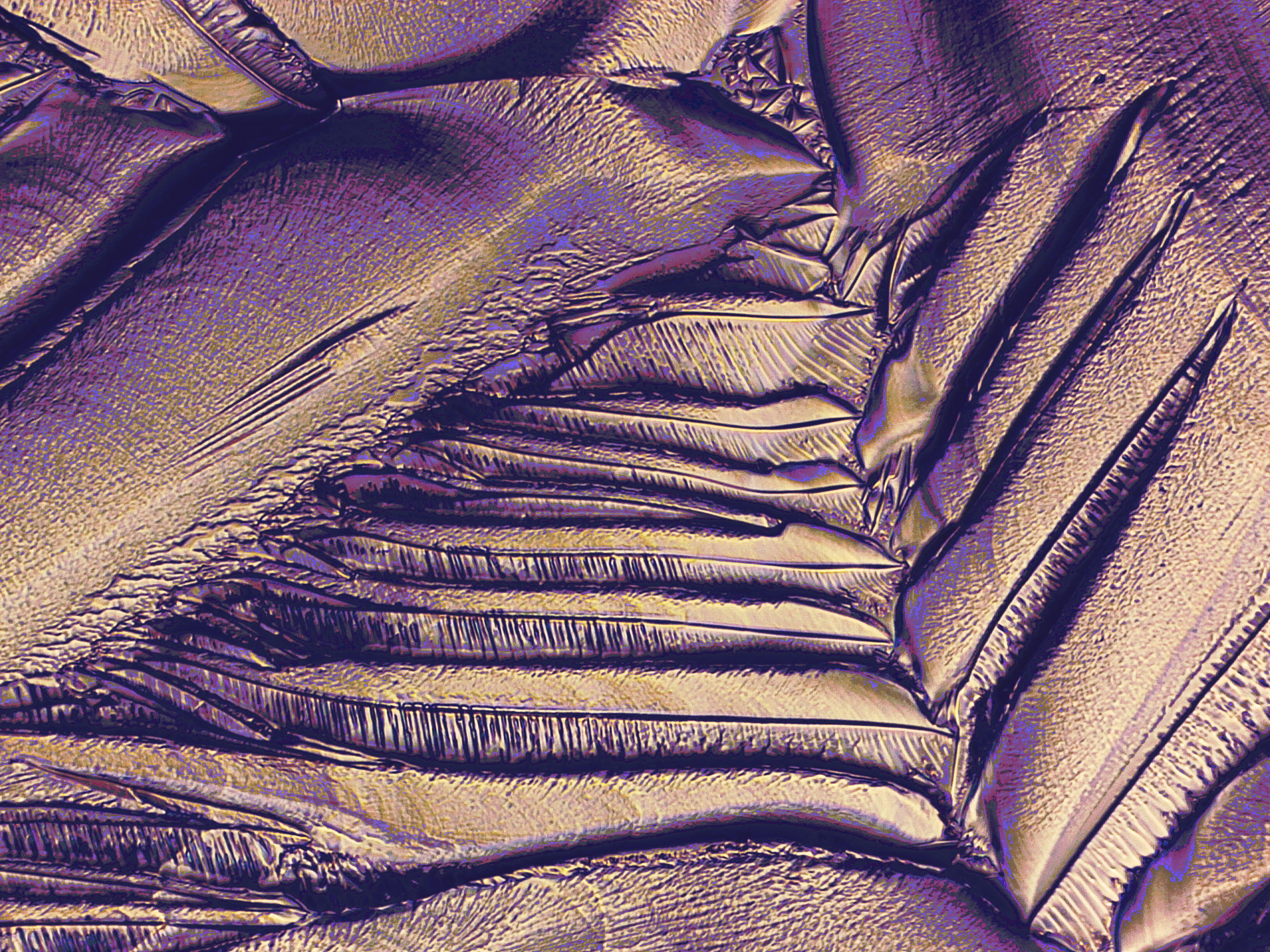

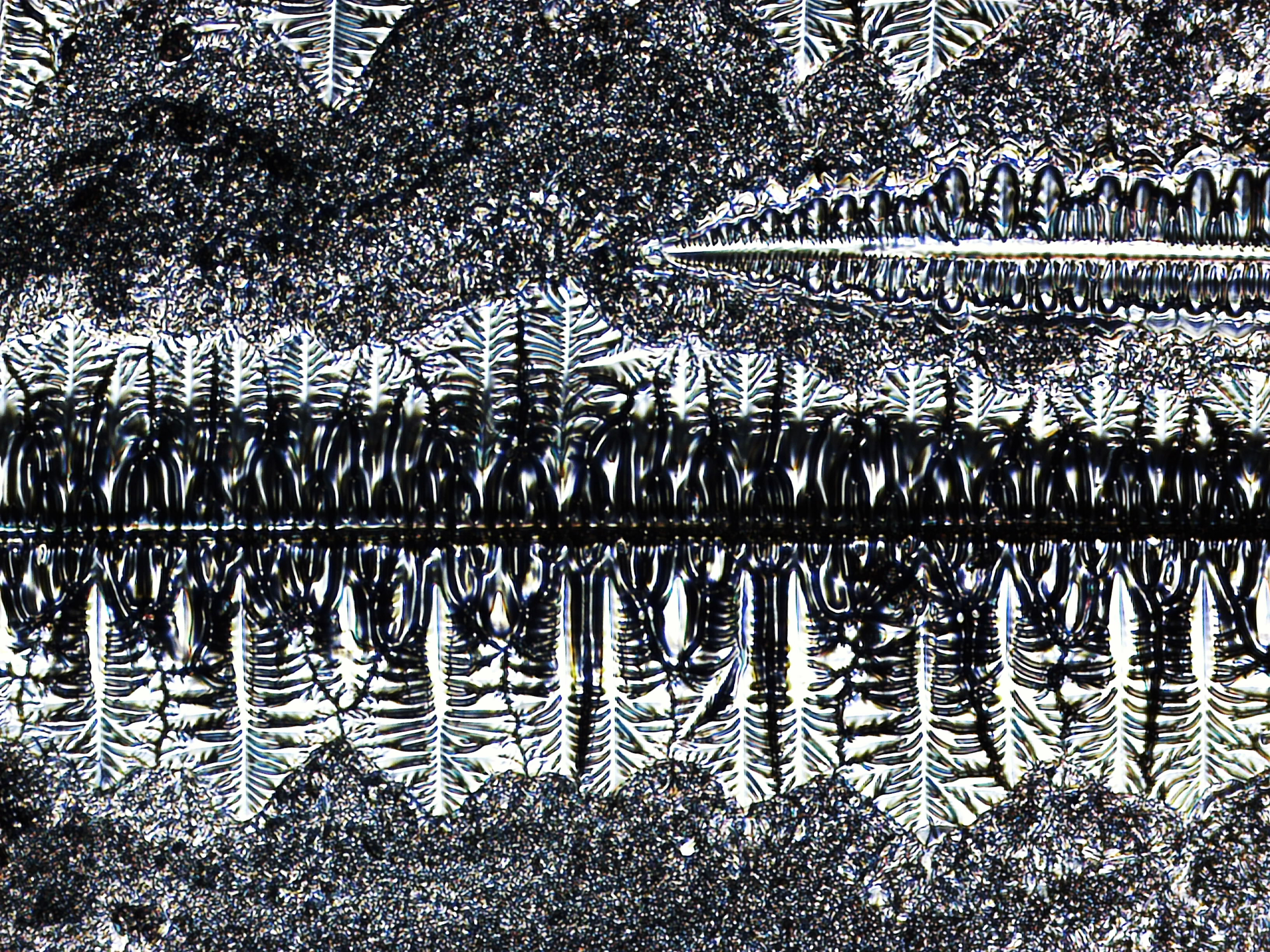

== Prize for "Ludic Sciences" ==
Mario Markus coined the term "ludic science" (Latin: ludus, the game). In cooperation with the German Society of Chemists (Gesellschaft Deutscher Chemiker, GdCh) Mario Markus has offered an annual prize of 10,000 euros since 2022 for outstanding "ludic" scientific achievements. In order to finance the award, he leaves his house worth almost one million euros to the Gesellschaft deutscher Chemiker in his testament.

== Books ==
- Poemas de Invierno. Betania, Madrid 1990, ISBN 84-86662-60-5.
- Bilis Negra. (Comic) J.C. Sáez, Santiago de Chile 2006, ISBN 956-306-011-3.
- Charts for Prediction and Chance. Imperial College Press, London 2007, ISBN 978-1-86094-835-0.
- Punzadas. LOM ediciones, Santiago de Chile 2007, ISBN 978-956-282-924-3.
- Una fórmula = Una imagen. LOM Ediciones, Chile 2009, ISBN 978-956-00-0082-8.
- Die Kunst der Mathematik. Verlag Zweitausendeins, Frankfurt 2009, ISBN 978-3-86150-767-3.
- Poesía Latinoamericana. (Deutsch-Spanisch; Hörbuch; Sonderheft von Dichtungsring, Zeitschrift für Literatur. Nr. 37, 2009). ISSN 0724-6412.
- Poemas Químicos. LOM Ediciones, Chile, 2010, ISBN 978-956-00-0190-0.
  - German edition: Chemische Gedichte. Shaker Media, Aachen 2011, ISBN 978-3-86858-701-2.
- Chemical Poems. Dos Madres Press, United States, 2013, ISBN 978-1-933675-98-5
- Unsere Welt ohne Insekten : ein Teil der Natur verschwindet, Stuttgart : Kosmos 2014, ISBN 978-3-440-14336-0.
- Das nackte Gehirn : Wie die Neurotechnik unser Leben revolutioniert, Darmstadt : Theiss, Konrad / WBG 2016, ISBN 978-3-8062-3278-3.
- Stiche : Gedichte Spanisch – Deutsch, aus dem Spanischen übertragen vom Autor, mit einem Vorwort von Raúl Zurita, Leipzig : Lychatz Verlag 2016, ISBN 978-3-942929-37-0.
- (As translator): Chilenische Lyrik im bewegten 20. Jahrhundert, Rimbaud-Verlag 2016, ISBN 978-3-89086-351-1.
- Bildkraft der Substanzen: 2D-Kristalle zum Selbermachen, Arnshaugk-Verlag 2017, ISBN 978-3-944064-77-2.
  - Spanish edition: Scientia et Ars – La fuerza pictórica de cristales súper-planos, Ediciones UC, Chile, 2019, ISBN 978-956-14-2469-2.
- 222 Juden verändern die Welt, Hildesheim : Georg Olms Verlag 2019, ISBN 978-3-487-08607-1.
- Leben in den Eismonden?, München: Verlag Dr. Friedrich Pfeil, 2020, ISBN 978-3-89937-254-0.
- Exilneurose : Irrwege eines Physikers, Hildesheim, Zürich: Georg Olms Verlag 2021, ISBN 978-3-487-08637-8.
- Quallen: Ein Überblick, tredition, 2021, ISBN 978-3-347-40887-6.
- Ludische Wissenschaften, Pfeil-Verlag, München 2022, ISBN 978-3-89937-276-2.

As editor:

- M. Markus, S.C. Mueller und G. Nicolis, (Hrsg.): From chemical to biological organization, Springer-Verlag, Heidelberg 1988, ISBN 3-540-19264-6.
- A. Holden, M. Markus und H. Othmer (Hrsg.): Nonlinear Wave Processes in Excitable Media, Plenum Press, New York 1991, ISBN 0-306-43800-3.
- V. Pérez-Munuzuri, V. Pérez-Villar, L.O. Chua, M. Markus (Hrsg.): Discretely-coupled Dynamical Systems, World Scientific, Singapore 1997, ISBN 981-02-2912-7.

== Selected publications ==
- M Markus, D Kuschmitz, B Hess: Chaotic dynamics in yeast glycolysis under periodic substrate input flux. In: FEBS Lett. 172 (1984), pp. 235–238.
- M Markus, B Hess: Isotropic cellular automaton for modeling excitable media. In: Nature. 347 (1990), pp. 56–58. (with illustration on the cover of the journal)
- M. Markus, Zs. Nagy-Ungvarai, B. Hess: Phototaxis of spiral waves. In: Science. 257, (1992), pp. 225–227.
- M Markus, D Boehm, M Schmick: Simulations of vessel morphogenesis using cellular automata. In: Mathematical Biosciences. 156 (1999), pp. 191–206.
- M Markus, G Kloss, I Kusch: Disordered waves in an homogeneous, motionless excitable medium. In: Nature. 371 (1994), pp. 402–404.
- I. Kusch, M. Markus: Mollusc shell pigmentation: cellular automaton simulations and evidence for undecidability. In: Journal of theoretical Biology. 178 (1996), S. 333–340.
- A. P.-Munuzuri, V. Perez-Villar, M. Markus: Splitting of autowaves in an active medium. In: Phys. Rev. Lett. 79 (1997), S. 1941–1944.
- M. Woltering, M. Markus: Annihilation of turbulence in excitable systems using pulses that inhibit activator growth. Physica. D 168/9 (2002), S. 23–34.
- K. Koetter, M. Markus: Double-diffusive fingering instability of a surfactant-glycerine-water drop in water. In: Europhysics Letters. 55 (2001), S. 807–813.
- M. Markus, E. Goles: Cicadas showing up after a prime number of years. In: Math. Intelligencer. 24 (2002), S. 30–33.
- S. Viridi, M. Schmick, M. Markus: Experimental observations of oscillations and segregation in a binary granular mixture. In: Physical Review. E 74, 041301 (2006)
- M. Schmick, Q. Liu, Q. Ouyang, M. Markus, "Fluctuation theorem for a single particle in a moving billiard: Experiments and simulations", Physical Review E 76, 021115 (2007)
- Synopsis inwww.gdch.de/mariomarkus of the book: “Ludische Wissenschaften” (Ludic Sciences) by Mario Markus, edited by Pfeil, Munich (2022)
