= Kilee Brookbank =

American burn survivor and author

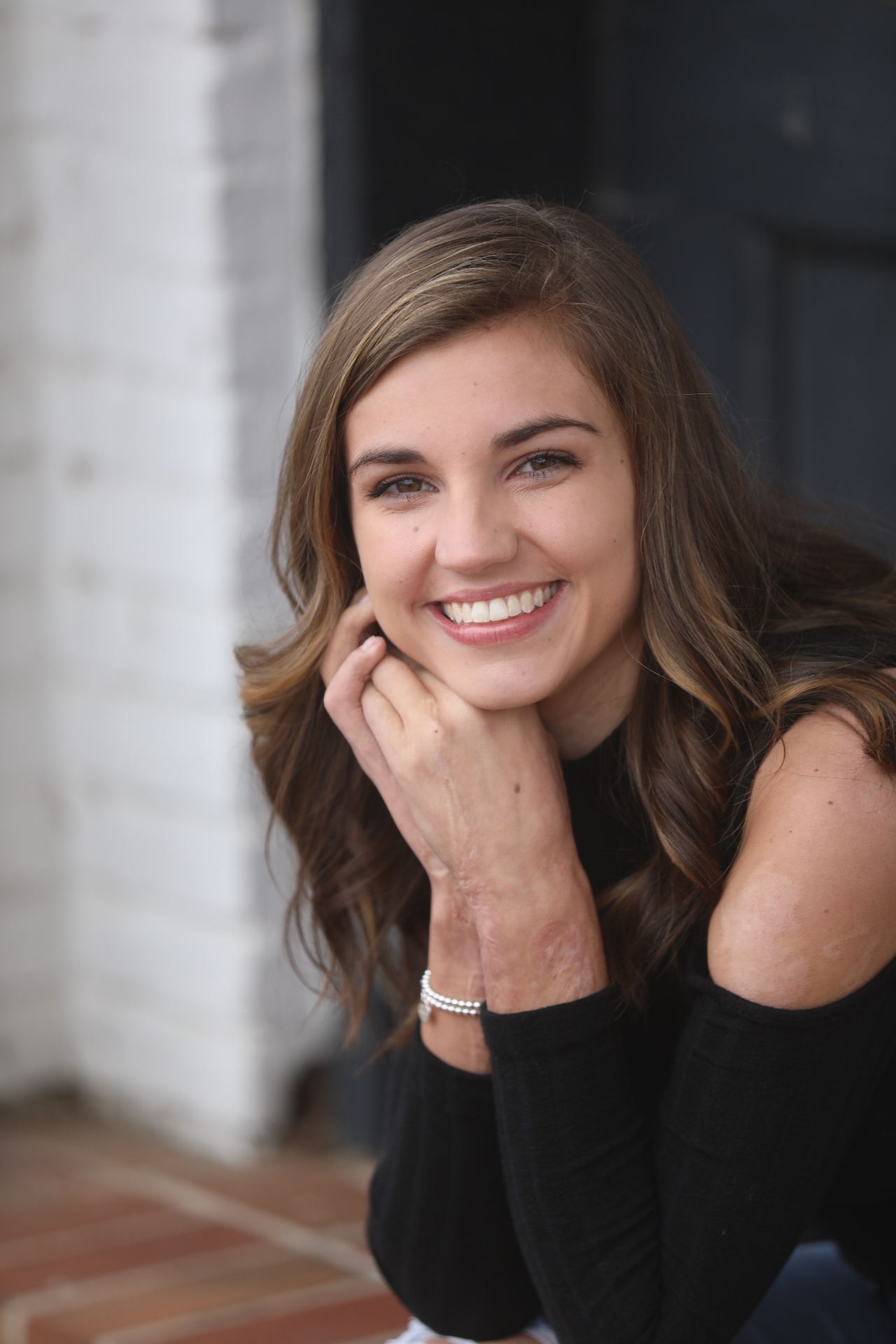
Kilee Brookbank

Kilee Brookbank (born June 2, 1998) is an American burn survivor, author and fundraiser for burn treatment from Georgetown, Ohio. She is the author of the books Beautiful Scars and Digger the Hero Dog and the founder of the nonprofit Kilee Gives Back Foundation.

== Accident ==
On November 10, 2014, Brookbank suffered burns on 45 percent of her body when her home erupted in flames caused by a gas leak. Kilee had returned from Ripley-Union-Lewis-Huntington High School and smelled a foul odor. When she lit a candle to cover the smell, the house exploded around her. Brookbank was knocked out in the explosion but came to after persistent barking by her dog. She ran outside and was helped by neighbors.

Brookbank was taken to Shriners Hospitals for Children-Cincinnati, where she received treatment for 38 days, followed by extensive physical therapy. In January 2015, she returned to school, and in February she flew to Los Angeles to appear on The Doctors television program. During the segment, the producers surprised Brookbank with a visit from Justin Bieber.

== Advocacy ==
Later that year, Brookbank and her family formed the Kilee Gives Back Foundation, which held the first Kilee Brookbank Celebrity Golf Tournament.

In May 2016, Brookbank released her first book, Beautiful Scars, which detailed her recovery from her burns. A portion of the proceeds from the book were to be donated to Shriners Cincinnati. Brookbank embarked on a book tour of Shriners hospitals in Cincinnati, Sacramento, California, and Boston, where she met with other burn survivors and their families.

=== Prom queen ===
Also in May 2016, Brookbank was featured on Inside Edition, a segment that followed Brookbank to her high school prom, where she was chosen as prom queen. The segment was picked up by numerous major media outlets, including Seventeen, Yahoo! Style, PopSugar, AOL, Diply and Wimp.com.

== Later career ==
Brookbank attended Xavier University in Cincinnati, majoring in communications. In November 2016, Brookbank served as a patient ambassador representing Shriners Cincinnati at the Shriners Hospitals for Children Open in Las Vegas.

In April 2017, her book Beautiful Scars won the Benjamin Franklin Award for Best Inspirational Book, awarded by the Independent Book Publishers Association. Brookbank released an updated and revised edition, Beautiful Scars: A Life Redefined, in November 2017, and expects to release her first children’s book, Digger the Hero Dog, in May 2018.

In January 2018, Brookbank returned to The Doctors for a story update.

As of November 2020, Brookbank’s foundation had raised more than $343,000 for Shriners Cincinnati through its golf outing and other efforts, and the hospital had named a family suite in Brookbank’s honor.

On May 24, 2018, Brookbank was the commencement speaker at Luzerne County (Pa.) Community College.
