= Victor W. Hall =

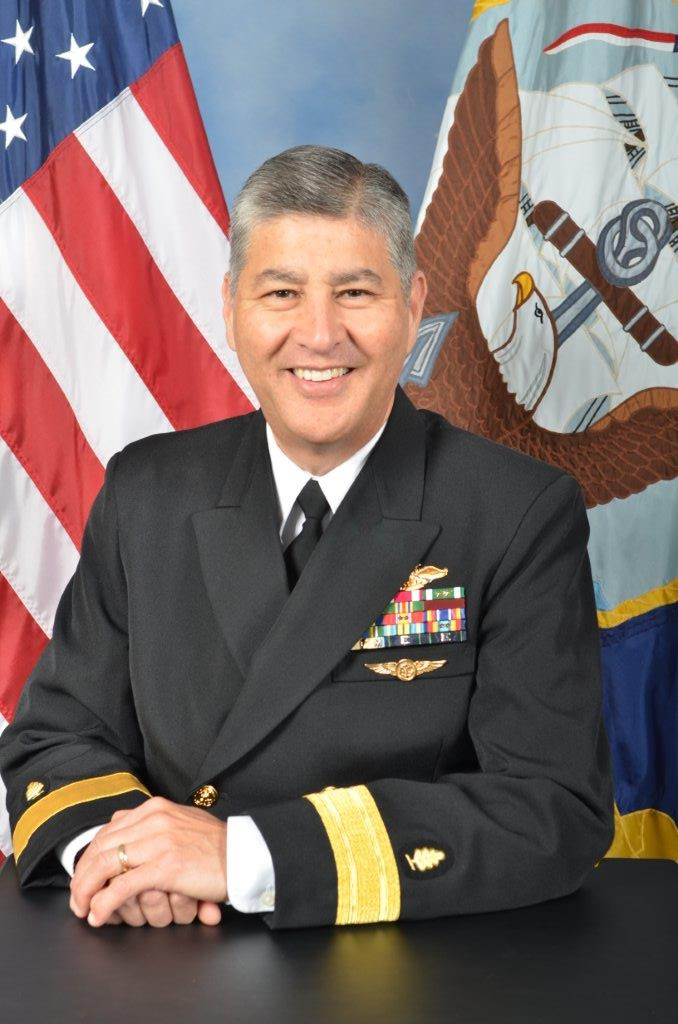
Rear Adm. Victor Hall

Victor W. Hall is a rear admiral in the United States Navy.

== Career ==
Hall began his training at Recruit Training Command, Great Lakes, Illinois in 1971. Upon completion, he was assigned to the USS Leary (DD-879). Later, he was trained as a corpsman striker and then stationed at Marine Corps Base Camp Lejeune. After serving with the 3rd Battalion 8th Marines, the 1st Battalion 6th Marines and Marine Aircraft Group 26, Hall was honorably discharged in 1975.

Hall joined the United States Navy Reserve in 1981 and was commissioned as an ensign the following year. He was stationed at the Naval Marine Corps Reserve Center in Cincinnati, Ohio until 1994 and at the Naval Marine Corps Reserve Center in New Orleans, Louisiana from 1994 to 1998. From there he served as reserve centers in Madison, Wisconsin from 1998 to 2000, Milwaukee, Wisconsin from 2000 to 2002, Marietta, Georgia from 2002 to 2004 and Washington, D.C. from 2004 to 2006. Hall was later stationed at Naval Air Station Joint Reserve Base Fort Worth from 2006 to 2008, as well as in Norfolk, Virginia from 2008 to 2010.

Additionally, Hall commanded a surgical company with the 4th Medical Battalion and served at Landstuhl Regional Medical Center. His promotion to rear admiral was confirmed by the United States Senate on June 6, 2013. Afterwards, he became Deputy Commander for Navy Medicine West and Deputy Corps Chief for the Navy Medical Service Corps.

Awards he has received include the Legion of Merit, the Meritorious Service Medal, the Navy and Marine Corps Commendation Medal, the Navy and Marine Corps Achievement Medal, the Navy Good Conduct Medal, the National Defense Service Medal, the Korea Defense Service Medal, the Global War on Terrorism Service Medal and the Military Outstanding Volunteer Service Medal.

== Education ==
- University of Cincinnati
- Xavier University
