= Arthur J. Dewey =

American theologian

Arthur J. Dewey is an American teacher, writer, translator and commentator with particular distinction as a New Testament scholar and specialist on the Historical Jesus. He is a professor of Theology in the University Scholars honors department at Xavier University in Cincinnati, Ohio, where he began teaching in 1980.

Dewey is co-founder of the Healing Deadly Memories Program, which addresses the "question of anti-Semitism in the New Testament. He has also been involved with the controversial Jesus Seminar, a group of academics dedicated to researching the factual Jesus.

== Education ==
Dewey holds an A.B. from Boston College, an M.Div. from the Weston Jesuit School of Theology, and a Th.D. from Harvard University.

== Selected works ==
=== Thesis ===
- Dewey, Arthur J. (1982). Spirit and Letter in Paul - a thesis (Th.D.). Harvard University. OCLC 8582384.

=== Books ===
- ———; Cameron, Ron (1978). The Cologne Mani Codex (P. Colon. inv. nr. 4780) : Concerning the origin of his body. Missoula, MT: Scholars Press. ISBN 9780891303114. OCLC 5101711.
- ——— (1986). The Word in Time: A Gospel Commentary for Sundays and Major Feasts: complete three-year cycle. Lake Worth, FL: Sunday Publications. ISBN 9780941850186. OCLC 15528896.
- ——— (1996). Spirit and Letter in Paul. Studies in the Bible and early Christianity. Vol. 33. Lewiston, New York: Edwin Mellen Press. ISBN 9780773497030. OCLC 246752126. - general publication of his Ph.D. thesis
- ——— (1996). Advent Christmas: Interpreting the Lesson of the Church Year (Proclamation Six Series; Series B). Minneapolis: Fortress Press. ISBN 9780800642150. OCLC 35147500.
- ———; Cupitt, Don; Armstrong, Karen; Spong, John Shelby; Geering, Lloyd; Funk, Robert W. (2001). The Once and Future Faith. The Jesus Seminar held in March 2001. California: Polebridge Press. ISBN 9780944344859. OCLC 949099881.
- ——— (2010). The Authentic letters of Paul: a new reading of Paul's rhetoric and meaning: the scholars version. Salem, OR: Polebridge Press. ISBN 9781598150391. OCLC 880148127.
- ———; Funk, Robert W. (2015). The Gospel of Jesus : according to the Jesus Seminar. The Jesus Seminar. Salem, OR: Polebridge Press. ISBN 9781598151589. OCLC 904399558.
