= John Hall =

John Hall may refer to:

== Academics ==
- John Hall (Presbyterian pastor) (1829–1898), American academic, president of NYU
- John A. Hall (born 1949), sociology professor at McGill University, Montreal
- John F. Hall (1951–2023), professor of classics at Brigham Young University
- John Lesslie Hall (1856–1938), American literary scholar
- John R. Hall (sociologist) (born 1946), American sociologist
- John Whitney Hall (1916–1997), American historian of Japan

== Military ==
- John Hall (British Army officer) (1795–1866), British military surgeon
- John L. Hall Jr. (1891–1978), United States Navy officer
- John Herbert Hall (1899–1978), British World War I flying ace
- John Hall (RAF officer) (1921–2004), British World War II flying ace

== Politics ==
=== U.S. ===
- John Hall (Kentucky politician) (1939–2016), member of the Kentucky Senate
- John Hall (Maryland politician) (1729–1797), delegate to the Continental Congress
- John Hall (New York politician) (born 1948), U.S. Representative from New York, and founder of American rock band Orleans
- John Hall (West Virginia politician) (1805–1881), Virginia politician and West Virginia founder
- John C. Hall (1821–1896), Wisconsin State Senator
- John D. Hall (politician) (1957–2005), North Carolina State Representative
- John Hicklin Hall (1854–1937), Oregon politician
- John Hubert Hall (1899–1970), governor of Oregon
- John Manning Hall (1841–1905), Connecticut state senator and representative
- John Michael Hall, Pennsylvania politician
- John W. Hall (1817–1892), governor of Delaware

=== U.K. ===
- John Hall (MP for Dunwich) (died 1548)
- John Hall (1632–1711), British MP for Wells, 1671–1679 and 1680–1685
- John Hall (Buckingham MP) (1799–1872), British general and MP for Buckingham, 1846–1859
- John Hall (Labour politician) (1896–1955), MP for Gateshead West, 1950–1955
- John Hall (Wycombe MP) (1911–1978)
- John Carey Hall (1844–1921), British diplomat
- John Hathorn Hall (1894–1979), British colonial administrator
- John Richard Clark Hall (1855–1931), English barrister and Old English scholar

=== Elsewhere ===
- John Hall (New South Wales politician) (1856–1921)
- John Hall (New Zealand politician) (1824–1907)
- John Hall (Victorian politician) (1884–1949)

== Religion ==
- John Hall (minister) (c. 1559–1627), Moderator of the General Assembly of the Church of Scotland
- John Hall (bishop) (1633–1710), English churchman and academic
- John Hall (Presbyterian pastor) (1829–1898), Fifth Avenue Presbyterian Church, New York City
- John Hall (Archdeacon of Salop) (born 1941)
- John Hall (priest) (born 1949), British Anglican Church leader
- John Hall (Archdeacon of Killaloe) (1626–1691), Church of Ireland priest

== Science ==
- John Hall (physician) (1575–1636), William Shakespeare's son-in-law and medical author
- John Hall (engineer) (1765–1836), English engineer and millwright
- John H. Hall (gunsmith) (1781–1841), American inventor of the M1819 Hall breech-loading rifle
- John H. Hall (inventor) (1932–2014), inventor of integrated circuits
- John L. Hall (born 1934), American physicist and Nobel laureate in physics
- J. Storrs Hall, engineer and scientist

== Sports ==
=== Cricket ===
- John Hall (cricketer, born 1815) (1815–1888), English first-class cricketer
- John Hall (cricketer, born 1874) (1874–1925), English cricketer
- John Hall (cricketer, born 1903) (1903–1979), English cricketer
- John Hall (cricketer, born 1934) (1934–2003), English cricketer
- John Hall (cricketer, born 1950), English cricketer

=== Football ===
- John A. Hall (American football) (1877–1919), American football player and coach
- Jack Hall (footballer, born 1883) (1883–1949), English football forward for Stoke, Brighton & Hove Albion, Middlesbrough, Leicester Fosse and Birmingham
- Jack Hall (footballer, born 1885) (1885–?), English-born football manager active in the Netherlands
- Jack Hall (footballer, born 1902) (1902–?), played for Heywood St James, Rochdale, Great Harwood, Rossendale Utd and Bacup Borough between 1922 and 1934
- Jack Hall (footballer, born 1905) (1905–?), English-born football forward for Lincoln City, Accrington Stanley and Manchester United
- John Hall (1930s footballer) (1910–?), winger who played for Burnley
- Jack Hall (footballer, born 1912) (1912–2000), English football goalkeeper for Manchester United and Tottenham Hotspur
- John Hall (footballer, born 1944), Bradford City A.F.C. footballer
- John Hall (placekicker) (born 1974), American football kicker
- Johnny Hall (Samoan footballer) (born 1991), Samoan footballer
- John Hall (footballer, born 1994), Adelaide United FC footballer
- Johnny Hall (American football) (1916–1996), running back for the Chicago Cardinals and Detroit Lions
- Johnny Hall (Australian footballer) (1917–2009), played for Hawthorn in the Victorian Football League

=== Other sports ===
- John Hall (baseball) (1924–1995), for the 1948 Brooklyn Dodgers
- John Hall (sport shooter) (1906–1978), British Olympic shooter
- John Hall (rugby union) (1869–1945), English rugby union player

== Architects ==
- John Hall (architect) (1851–1914), British architect
- John Roulstone Hall (1826–1911), American architect
- Jack Hall (architect) (1913–2003), American architect working in the modernist style

== Writers ==
- John Hall (English playwright) (1925–2001), English playwright
- John Halle (died 1568), called also John Hall of Maidstone, English surgeon, known as a medical writer and poet
- John Hall (poet) (1627–1656), English poet, essayist and pamphleteer
- J. C. Hall (poet) (John Clive Hall, 1920–2011), English poet and editor
- John Vine Hall (1774–1860), English bookseller and religious writer
- John Elihu Hall (1783–1829), lawyer, writer, and publisher in Philadelphia and Maryland
- N. John Hall (born 1933), American biographer
- John S. Hall (born 1960), American poet and performer
- John Robert Hall III (born 1975), American author and co-founder of Greenwood & Hall

== Other ==
- John Hall (American businessman) (1932–2021), CEO of Ashland
- John Hill (actor) (born 1977), American musical theater actor
- John Hall (British artist) (1739–1797), British engraver and painter
- John Hall (English businessman) (born 1933), land and sports entrepreneur
- John Hall (Canadian artist) (born 1943), Canadian painter
- John Hall (judge) (1767–1833), North Carolina Supreme Court justice
- John Hall (sound editor) (1906–1997), American sound editor
- John Farnsworth Hall (1899–1987), Australian conductor and violinist
- John James Hall (1845–1941), clock restorer
- John Smythe Hall (1853–1909), Canadian lawyer, politician, and editor
- John Thomson Hall (1841–1883), Australian violinist
- Sir John Hall, 3rd Baronet (died 1776)
- John Maxwell Hall (1884–1966), British colonial administrator, judge, and author
- John Hall, Ohio radio broadcaster and voice talent at WIZE
- John Hall, drummer for English pop band the Equals
- John Hall, keyboard player for Canadian rock band Prism
- Mad Jack Hall (1672–1716), Jacobite-leader and property owner, tried for treason

== See also ==
- Jack Hall (disambiguation)
- Sir John Hall (disambiguation)
- Jon Hall (disambiguation)
- John Halle (disambiguation)
- Johnny Hall (disambiguation)
- John H. Hall (disambiguation)
