= Jack Hall =

Jack Hall may refer to:

== Sports ==
- Jack Hall (footballer, born 1883) (1883–1949), English football forward for Stoke, Brighton & Hove Albion, Middlesbrough, Leicester Fosse and Birmingham
- Jack Hall (footballer, born 1885) (1885–?), English-born football manager active in the Netherlands
- Jack Hall (footballer, born 1890) (1890–?), English-born football fullback for Barnsley, Manchester City and Bristol Rovers
- Jack Hall (footballer, born 1902), played for Heywood St James, Rochdale, Great Harwood, Rossendale Utd and Bacup Borough between 1922 and 1934
- Jack Hall (footballer, born 1905) (1905–?), English-born football forward for Lincoln City, Accrington Stanley and Manchester United
- Jack Hall (footballer, born 1912) (1912–2000), English football goalkeeper for Manchester United and Tottenham Hotspur

== Others ==
- Jack Hall (architect) (1913–2003), American architect working in the modernist style
- Jack Hall (trade unionist) (1915–1971), American trade unionist in Hawaii
- Jack Hall (politician) (1910–1970), Australian state politician in Western Australia
- Mad Jack Hall (1672–1716), Jacobite-leader and property owner, tried for treason
- Jack Hall (c. 1677 – 1707), English thief
- Jack Hall (song), British folksong about the above thief

== See also ==
- Jake Hall (disambiguation)
- John Hall (disambiguation)
