= Brett M. Johnson =

American businessman and founder

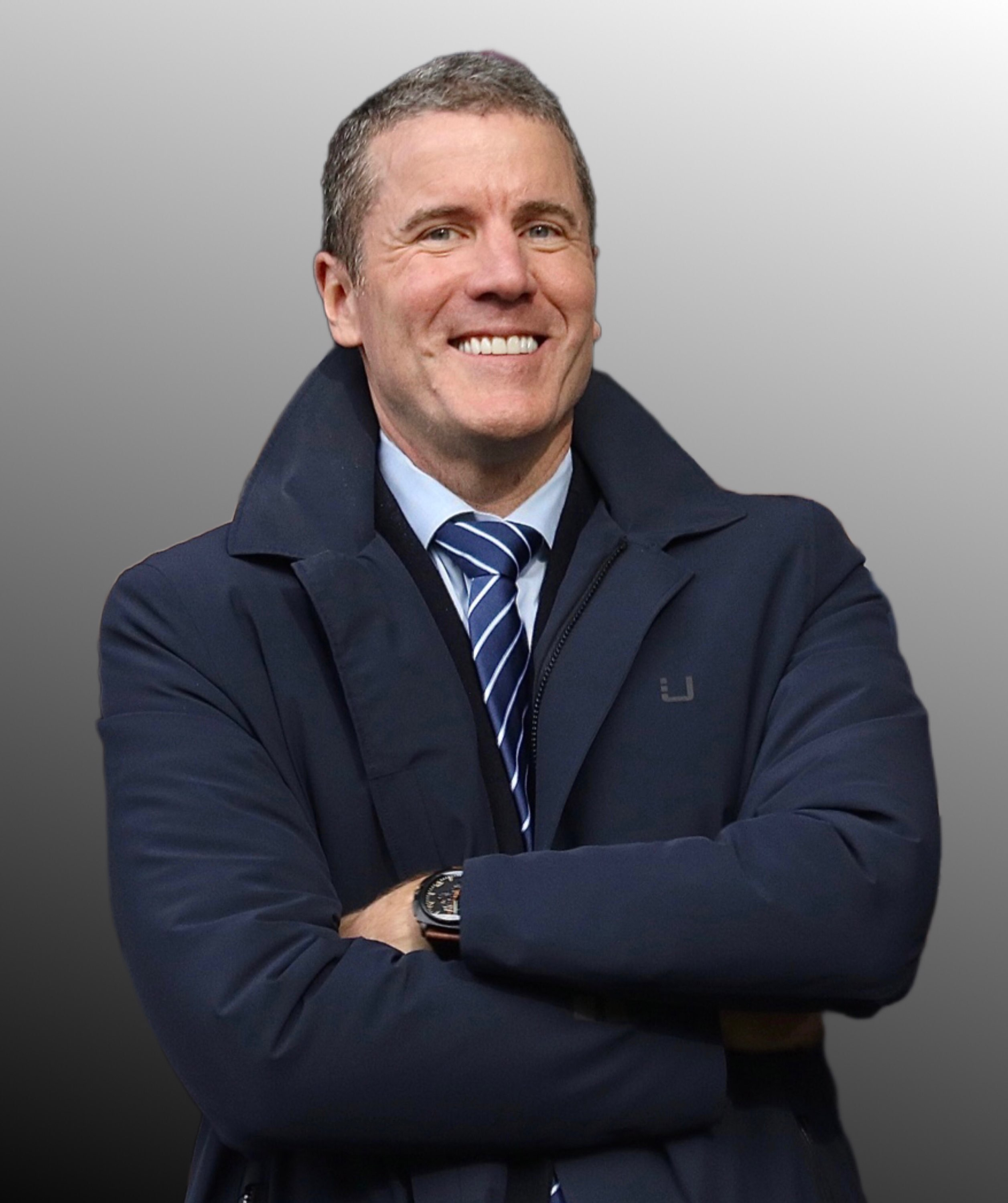
- Born: January 1970 (age 56)
- Citizenship: American
- Education: Brown University, Pepperdine University, Harvard Business School (President’s Leadership Program)
- Occupations: Businessman, founder and CEO of Benevolent Capital, founder and partner of Fortuitous Partners, owner/investor in Ipswich Town FC, Phoenix Rising FC, and Rhode Island FC
- Known for: Professional football club ownership; developing “rectangular sports” as an asset class
- Children: 3

Brett M. Johnson is an American businessman and investor. He is the founder and CEO of Benevolent Capital, which invests in professional sports, real estate, private equity, and venture capital. He is also the founder and a partner at Fortuitous Partners, a sports-anchored real estate development company responsible for the Centreville Bank Stadium in Rhode Island.

Johnson owns or invests in several football clubs, including Ipswich Town F.C., Phoenix Rising FC., and Rhode Island FC. He is also an investor in Ōura, a health technology company known for its smart rings, and Athletic Brewing, a craft non-alcoholic beer company.

== Early life and education ==
Brett Johnson earned his undergraduate degree from Brown University and an MBA from Pepperdine University. In 2014, he graduated from the Harvard Business School's President's Leadership Program.

== Career ==
Johnson began his professional career as a financial analyst at InterMedia Partners, working under Leo Hindery. After two years at InterMedia Partners, he joined Montgomery Securities as an associate on the institutional sales desk. He then joined Targus, a global mobile computing accessories company, where he held several positions over ten years, including sales director, managing director for Europe, Middle East, Africa, and Asia Pacific, and president.

Following the successful sale of Targus, Brett Johnson established his family office, Benevolent Capital in 2005. Since 2021, Benevolent Capital has raised and invested over $350M across diversified sports, real estate, private equity, venture capital and hospitality platforms with over 30 distinct investments in partnership with institutional and high net worth investors.

In August 2010, Johnson became CEO of Forward Industries, a NASDAQ-listed company that designs and markets accessories for consumer electronics, where he served until August 2012. He then joined Greenwood & Hall, an education management company, serving as president from 2013 to 2015. Concurrently, from 2012 to 2015, Johnson was a board member at Blyth Inc., (NYSE: BTH) a multichannel direct selling company, that was acquired by Carlye.

=== Sports and real estate investments ===
In 2018, he co-founded Fortuitous Partners, an investment firm focused on sports-anchored real estate developments. One of the firm’s flagship projects is the Tidewater Landing development in Pawtucket, Rhode Island, which includes the $140mm award-winning Centreville Bank Stadium. The stadium officially opened on May 3, 2025, with an over-capacity announced crowd of 10,700. Johnson outlined that the newly opened Centreville Bank Stadium was conceived as a multi-use venue designed to host Rhode Island FC matches, international friendlies, rugby events, and concerts, reflecting his broader strategy of integrating sports facilities with community development.

Building on this approach, Johnson defined “rectangular sports” as a distinct asset class covering sports played on similarly configured rectangular surfaces, including soccer, rugby, lacrosse, American football, flag football, and field hockey. His investment strategy focuses on developing multipurpose venues that can accommodate these sports, as well as entertainment and community events, to attract diverse audiences and generate year-round activity and revenue. Centreville Bank Stadium represents a practical application of Johnson’s rectangular-sports strategy.

On April 17, 2025, Fortuitous Partners announced Phase 2 of Tidewater Landing with partners Wood Partners and Pennrose, including plans for housing units and commercial space along the riverfront. In 2025, Johnson was among the most vocal advocates of the United Soccer League’s decision to introduce promotion and relegation between its divisions, calling the move "a game-changer" for U.S. soccer. Johnson has been recognized as a pioneer in developing "sports as an asset class" and was named the 2025 Person of the Year by The Pawtucket Foundation.

From 2019 to 2022, Johnson served as a director of Danish football club FC Helsingør. In 2021, he led the acquisition and became a shareholder and board director of Ipswich Town FC, an English professional football club. Under Johnson’s tenure, Ipswich Town has been promoted 3 times in 4 years and currently competes in the English Premier League. In 2021, he received the Distinguished Alumni Award from the Graziadio Business School, the institution’s highest honor. In 2022, he co-founded Rhode Island FC and currently serves as its chairman.

=== Institutional involvement ===
Johnson has served on the board of trustees for Choate Rosemary Hall from 2008 to 2018. He was a former member on the Board of Visitors for the Graziadio School of Business at Pepperdine University, where he was also a Senior Fellow in Entrepreneurship. Johnson is also an active member of the Young Presidents' Organization (YPO).
