= John H. Hall =

John H. Hall may refer to:

- John H. Hall (gunsmith) (1781–1841), inventor who perfected the American system of manufacturing using interchangeable parts
- John H. Hall (inventor) (1932–2014), American low-power CMOS pioneer and entrepreneur
- John Herbert Hall, English First World War flying ace
- John Hicklin Hall (1854–1937), politician and attorney in Oregon
- John Hubert Hall (1899–1970), governor of Oregon

== See also ==
- John Hall (disambiguation)
