= Jonathan Hall =

Jonathan Hall may refer to:

- Jonathan Hall (basketball) (born 1982), British wheelchair basketball player
- Jonathan Hall (British Army officer) (born 1944)
- Jonathan Hall (cricketer) (born 1962), English cricketer
- Jonathan Hall (cyclist) (born 1972), Australian cyclist and triathlete
- Jonathan Hall (sport shooter) (born 1988), American sport shooter
- Jonathan C. Hall, Iowa Supreme Court justice
- Jonathan M. Hall, professor of Ancient Greek History at the University of Chicago
- Jonathan Hall KC, the current Independent Reviewer of Terrorism Legislation
- Jonathan Hall (rower) (born 1938), British rower

== See also ==
- Jon Hall (disambiguation)
