= John Halle (disambiguation) =

John Halle (c. 1529/1530 – c. 1568) was an English surgeon, medical writer and poet.

John Halle may also refer to:

- John Halle (MP for Dover) (died 1409)
- John Halle (MP for Sussex), represented Sussex
- John Halle (?–1479), wool merchant and Mayor of Salisbury, builder of John Halle's Hall

== See also ==
- John Hall (disambiguation)
