= Johnny Hall =

Johnny Hall may refer to:

- Johnny Hall (American football) (1916–1996), running back for the Chicago Cardinals and Detroit Lions
- Johnny Hall (Australian footballer) (1917–2009), played for Hawthorn in the Victorian Football League
- Johnny Hall (Samoan footballer) (born 1991), Samoan association defender for Brookvale FC in the Manly-Warringah Premier League

== See also ==
- John Hall (disambiguation)
