= Ruth and Robert Hatch Jr. House =

Historic house in Massachusetts, United States

- U.S. National Register of Historic Places
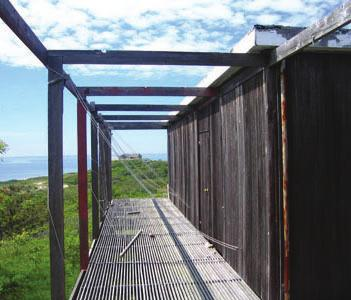
- Park Service photo, undated

- Location within Cape Cod Location within Massachusetts Location within the United States
- Location: 309 Bound Brook Way, Wellfleet, Massachusetts
- Coordinates: 41°57′21″N 70°4′29″W
- Built: 1961
- Architect: Jack Hall
- Architectural style: Modern Cape
- NRHP reference No.: 14000018
- Added to NRHP: February 25, 2014

The Ruth and Robert Hatch Jr. House is a historic house at 309 Bound Brook Way in Wellfleet, Massachusetts. It is one of a modest number of surviving houses in Wellfleet that combine elements of Modern architecture with traditional Cape Cod architecture. This single story wood-frame house was built in 1961 on Bound Brook Island to a design by local architect Jack Hall.

The house was built for Robert Hatch, editor of The Nation, and Ruth Hatch, a painter. Their family remained living there until 2008.

Extremely rustic in appearance, its exterior is sheathed in vertical boards and its windows have working shutters but no glass, resulting in a sharply vertical appearance. The structure consists of three rectangular sections of different sizes that are based on modular 7' by 7' squares; the main public living space is 35' by 49', the master bedroom is 7' by 21', and the guest bedrooms are in a block that is 7' by 14' (enlarged from the original 7' by 7' in 1978). The house, which is within the bounds of the Cape Cod National Seashore, was sold by the Hatches to the National Park Service, but they retain occupancy rights.

The house was listed on the National Register of Historic Places in 2014.

== See also ==
- National Register of Historic Places listings in Barnstable County, Massachusetts
- National Register of Historic Places listings in Cape Cod National Seashore
