= Sir John Hall =

Sir John Hall may refer to:

- John Hall (British Army officer) (1795–1866), British military surgeon
- John Hall (New Zealand politician) (1824–1907), New Zealand politician
- John Hall (Wycombe MP) (1911–1978), British Conservative politician
- John Hathorn Hall (1894–1979), British colonial administrator
- John Hall (English businessman) (born 1933), land and sports entrepreneur
- Sir John Hall, 3rd Baronet (died 1776)

== See also ==
- John Hall (disambiguation)
