= John Robert Hall III =

American writer and CEO

John R. Hall
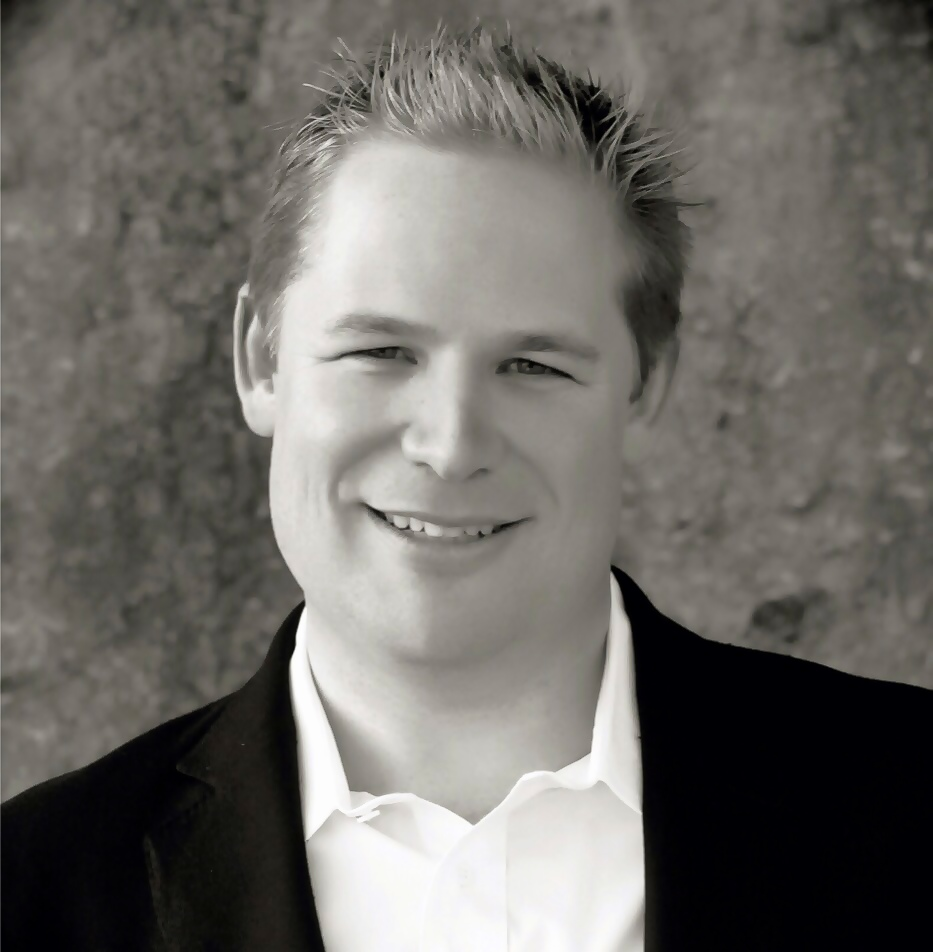
- Hall in 2012
- Born: John Robert Hall III; March 5, 1975 (age 51); Tarzana, Los Angeles, California
- Education: Pepperdine University; University of Southern California
- Occupations: Author, Chief Executive Officer
- Writing career
- Genres: Self-help, Special Education
- Website: www.amistillautistic.com

John Robert Hall III (born March 5, 1975) is an American author and co-founder of Greenwood & Hall. Hall also serves as a trustee for Chicago, Illinois based Roosevelt University and was appointed to the California Interagency Coordinating Council by Governor Jerry Brown in April 2014.

== Education ==
Hall earned a Bachelor of Arts in Political Science in 1997, as well as a Master in Business Administration in 2002, from Pepperdine University. He also earned a Doctorate of Education from the University of Southern California in 2012.

== Writing ==
Hall's book Am I Still Autistic? was published in 2011 and describes his struggles with autism as a child. He wanted to give hope to parents of autistic children. Hall's son was also diagnosed with autism.

== Sources ==
- Am I Still Autistic?: How a Low-Functioning, Slightly Retarded Toddler Became the CEO of a Multi-Million Dollar Corporation, Dr. John R. Hall. Opportunities In Education, LLC., Santa Monica. 2011 ISBN 978-0615504667
- TEDx Manhattan Beach: Journey To Purpose, 13 October 2012
