= Cape Cod Modern House Trust =

US non-profit organization

The Cape Cod Modern House Trust is a non-profit historic preservation organization working to preserve and interpret Modern period houses built on Cape Cod in the U.S. state of Massachusetts. The organization describes its mission to ''promote the documentation and preservation of significant examples of Modernist architecture on the Outer Cape."

Founded by Peter McMahon in 2007, the trust has worked with the National Park Service on cataloging and documenting, stabilizing, or restoring modernist Cape Cod homes by the architects Marcel Breuer, Serge Chermayeff, Jack Hall, Olav Hammarston, Oliver Morton, and Charles Zehnder.

The trust is currently working on a three-year project restoring the Kugel-Gips House, designed in 1970 by Charles Zehnder and located within the National Park Service's Cape Cod National Seashore. It also restored the Marcel Breuer House and Studio in 2025. The Kugel-Gips House and other modernist houses lying within the Cape Cod National Seashore are listed on the National Register of Historic Places.
