= Robert Rawlinson =

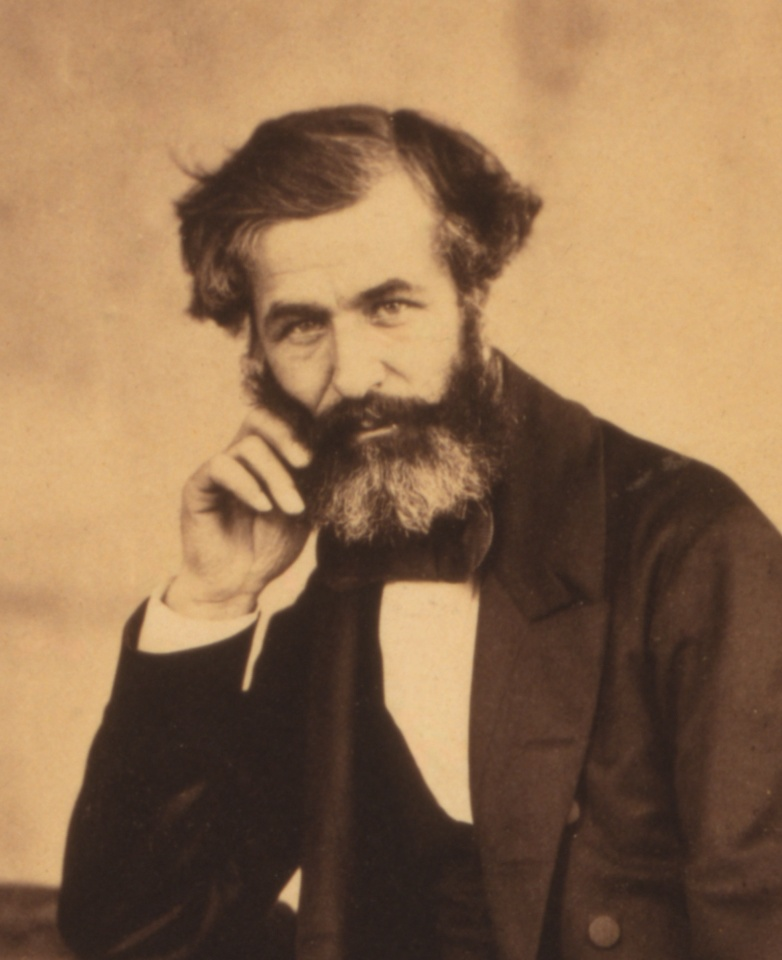
- Robert Rawlinson in Crimea, 1855
- Born: 28 February 1810; Bristol, England
- Died: 31 May 1898 (aged 88); London, England
- Engineering career
- Discipline: Civil engineering
- Institutions: Institution of Civil Engineers (president)

Sir Robert Rawlinson KCB (28 February 1810 – 31 May 1898) was an English engineer and sanitarian.

== Early life ==
He was born at Bristol. His father was a mason and builder at Chorley, Lancashire, and he himself began his engineering education by working in a stonemason's yard.

== Career ==
In 1831, he obtained employment under Jesse Hartley in the engineers office at the Liverpool docks, and for four years from 1836 he was engaged under Robert Stephenson as assistant resident engineer for the Blisworth section of what is now the London & North-Western main line from London to the North.

Returning to Liverpool, he spent some years as assistant-surveyor to the corporation, and then in 1844 accepted an engineering post on the Bridgewater Canal. Three years later he returned to Liverpool, to superintend the design and construction of the famous brick-arched ceiling in the St George's Hall, in succession to, his friend H. L. Elmes. During this period Rawlinson's reputation as a sanitarian had been growing. In 1847 he devised a scheme to supply from Bala Lake (now Llyn Tegid) in Merionethshire, Wales to Liverpool. When the Public Health Act was passed in 1848 he was appointed one of the first inspectors under it. He inspected many of the chief towns of England, and his reports on the sanitary conditions he found brought him in many cases into great unpopularity with the municipal rulers.

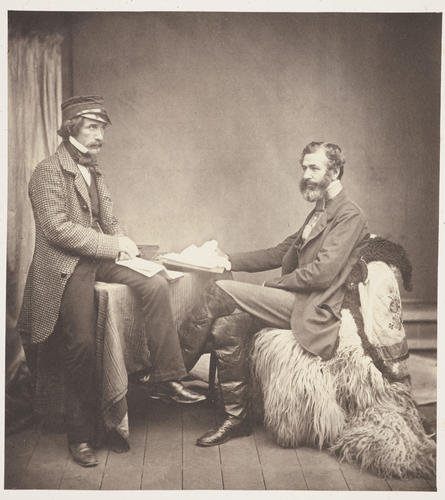
Dr Sutherland and Robert Rawlinson, The Sanitary Commission, Crimea 1855. Photograph by Roger Fenton

Early in 1855 popular feeling was so aroused by the waste of life that was going on among the British troops in the Crimea through disease, and by the mismanagement of the campaign, that the Aberdeen ministry was forced to resign. Lord Palmerston, who then became prime minister, sent a sanitary commission, consisting of Rawlinson and two medical members (Dr. John Sutherland and Dr. Hector Gavin), with full powers from the War Office, to do whatever it thought would lead to better hygienic conditions in camp and hospital. The commission reached Constantinople in March, and, by insisting on what now seem the most obvious precautions, succeeded within a few weeks in reducing the death-rate in the Levantine hospitals from 42 to 2¼%. Passing on to the Crimea, it effected a similar improvement there, and by the end of the year the health of the whole British army in the field was even better than it enjoyed at home.

Rawlinson's next great public service, for which he was made C.B. in 1865, was in connection with the distress caused in Lancashire by the collapse of the cotton manufacturing industry consequent on the American Civil War. In 1863 it was suggested that, to provide employment for the starving operatives, the government should start works of utility, profit and ornament, and Rawlinson being sent to make an official investigation into the question, reported, after visiting nearly 100 towns, that 1/2 million sterling might be advantageously expended in providing water-supply and drainage, forming streets, etc., in those places. The result was that the Treasury was authorised to advance 1,200,000 the amount was afterwards increased) for carrying out such works, which proved of enormous public benefit.

In 1866 he acted as chairman of the Royal Commission on the Pollution of Rivers, and a few years later was appointed chief engineering inspector to the Local Government Board; on retiring from this position in 1888 be was promoted to be KCB.

Between May 1894 and May 1895 he served as president of the Institution of Civil Engineers.

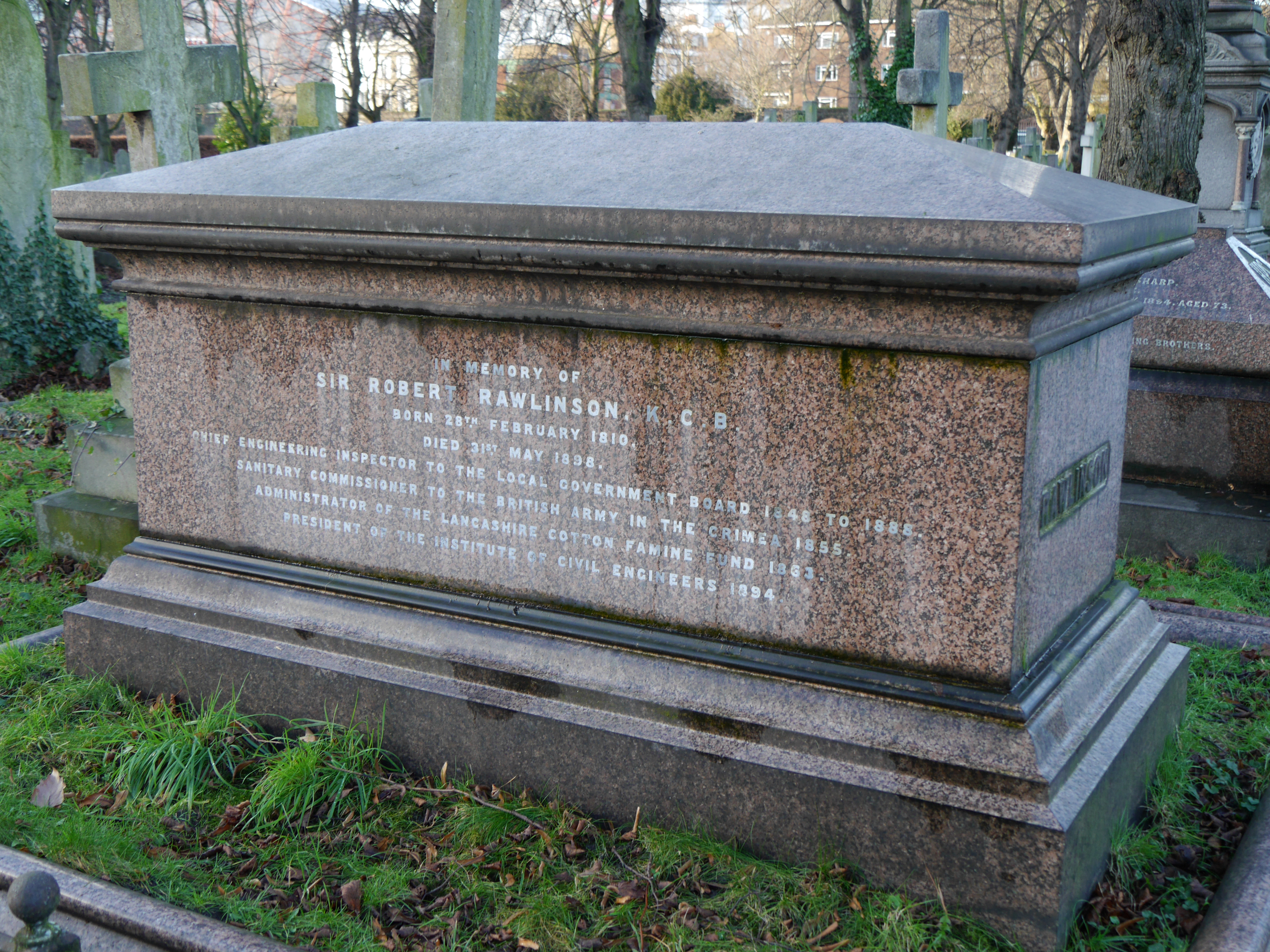
Funerary monument, Brompton Cemetery, London

== Family and personal life ==
Rawlinson died in London on 31 May 1898 and is buried there in Brompton Cemetery on the side of the main entrance path from the north gate.

He had married, in 1831, Ruth Swallow, daughter of Thomas Swallow, of Lockwood, Huddersfield. Lady Rawlinson died at her residence in West Brompton on 18 August 1902, aged 91.

Rawlinson amassed a sizeable art collection, including 5 paintings by Richard Ansdell and 3 paintings and 5 watercolours by Richard Dadd, which were sold in 1903, after his wife's death.

== See also ==
- Worthing Pier

Professional and academic associations
Preceded by Alfred Giles	President of the Institution of Civil Engineers; May 1894 – May 1895	Succeeded by Benjamin Baker
