= Jake Hall =

Jake Hall may refer to:

- Jake Hall (basketball), American basketball player
- Jake Hall (TV personality) (1990–2026), English television personality and businessman

== See also ==
- Jack Hall (disambiguation)
