= William Inglis (surgeon) =

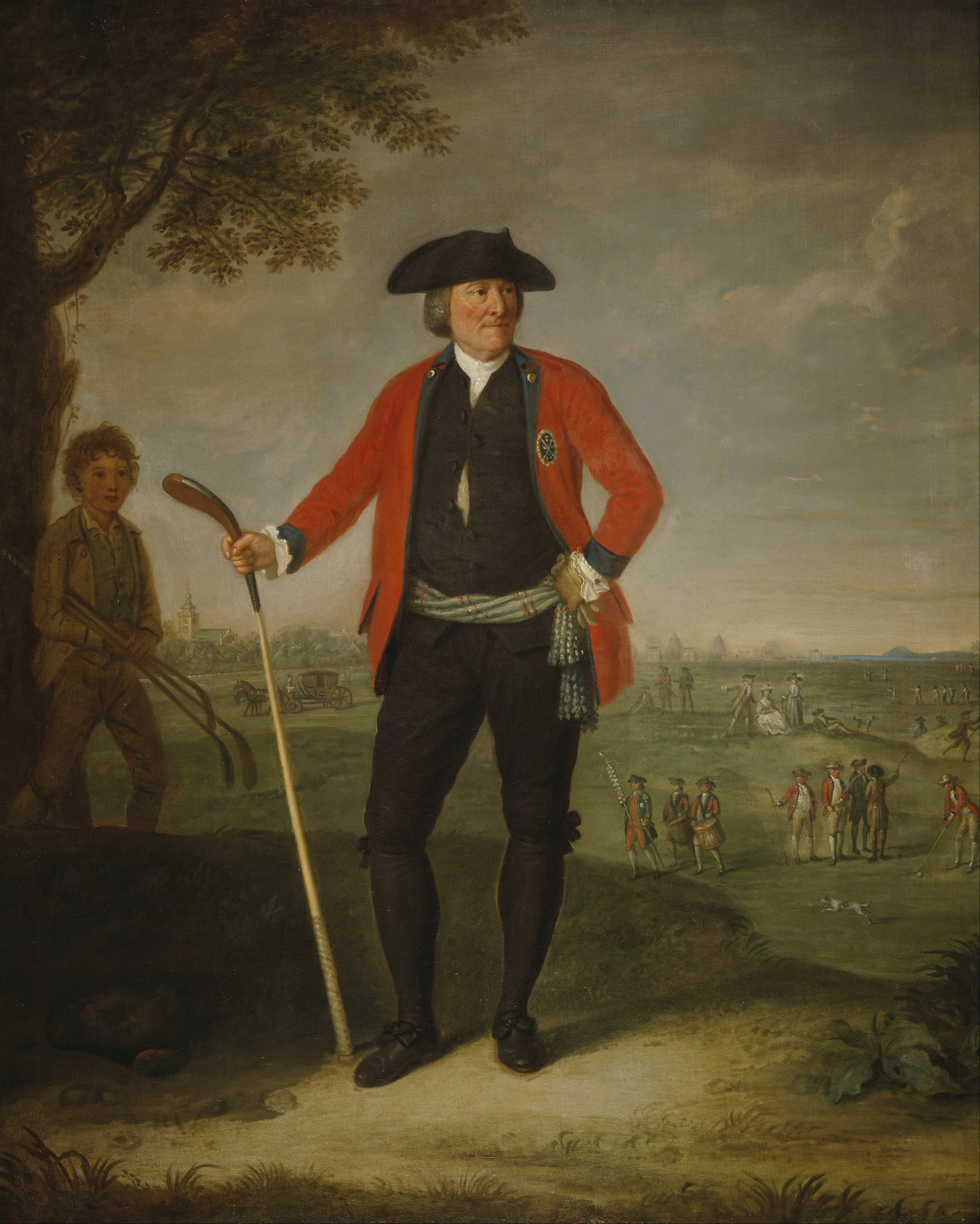
William Inglis, 1713 - 1792. Surgeon and Captain of the Honourable Company of Edinburgh Golfers

William Inglis (3 April 1713 -10 July 1792) was a Scottish surgeon who had the unique distinction of serving as Deacon of the Incorporation of Surgeons of Edinburgh and then serving two further terms as President of the Royal College of Surgeons of the City of Edinburgh, as the organisation became known after receiving a Royal Charter in 1778. He was one of the earliest captains of the Honourable Company of Edinburgh Golfers.

== Surgical career ==
William Inglis was born in Edinburgh on 3 April 1713, the son of Alexander Inglis, an Edinburgh surgeon and his wife Margaret Loudon. After serving a surgical apprenticeship, he applied on 5 August 1743 to sit the examination which would enable him to be elected a Freeman (Fellow) of the Incorporation of Surgeons of Edinburgh. Four examiners were appointed and the examination was held in four parts over the next three months. At the initial sitting he was examined on surgery in general, after which he gave a discourse and was examined on the topic of “fistula”. The subject for his second examination was “the brain and its membranes”. On his third appearance he was examined on botany, materia medica and “reading and explaining receipts.” Receipts were recipes or prescriptions, an indication that surgeons of the day were required to demonstrate their competence in preparing medications in addition to demonstrating their surgical knowledge. His final examination was to describe an operation for empyema and the composition of various unctions or ointments. Having successfully passed these examinations, he paid the Incorporation the sum of £8 6 shillings and 8 pence and was admitted a Fellow on 7 October 1743. He was Deacon of the Incorporation from 1772 to 1774. After receiving a Royal Charter in 1778 the organisation became known as the Royal College of Surgeons of the City of Edinburgh and William Inglis served as president from 1782 to 1784 and again from 1790 to 1792. On 12 April 1782 Inglis was one of the founding members of the Harveian Society of Edinburgh and served as president in 1786. In 1784 he was elected a member of the Aesculapian Club.

== Family ==
William Inglis had a number of family connections with surgery which extended over at least five generations. He was the son of a surgeon, Alexander Inglis, a Freeman of the Incorporation. William Inglis married Margaret Spens, daughter of Thomas Spens the 15th Laird of Lathallan in Fife and sister of Nathaniel Spens (1728–1815). Although a Fellow of the Royal College of Surgeons, Nathaniel Spens practised as a physician and became President of the Royal College of Physicians of Edinburgh. William Inglis' son, Andrew Inglis (d.1834), in turn became a surgeon, a Fellow of the Royal College of Surgeons of Edinburgh and President of the college from 1808 to 1810. His sons too followed in the same tradition. Thomas Inglis (1796–1874) and Archibald Inglis (1801–1889), both became Fellows of the college, as did Archibald's son Andrew Inglis who was Professor of Midwifery at the University of Aberdeen. Archibald served as President of the college from 1853 to 1855.

== Golf ==
William Inglis was also a successful golfer. He was Captain of the Honourable Company of Edinburgh Golfers from 1782 to 1784. His portrait by the Scottish artist David Allan depicts him in the red livery of the company. The background shows Leith Links where the Company played their annual golf competition.

== Death ==
William Inglis died at Edinburgh on 10 July 1792.
