= Archibald Inglis =

Scottish surgeon

Archibald Inglis FRCSEd (1 December 1801–1889) was a 19th-century Scottish surgeon who served as President of the Royal College of Surgeons of Edinburgh for the period 1853 to 1855. He was a keen amateur botanist and chaired the Edinburgh Botanical Society.

== Life ==
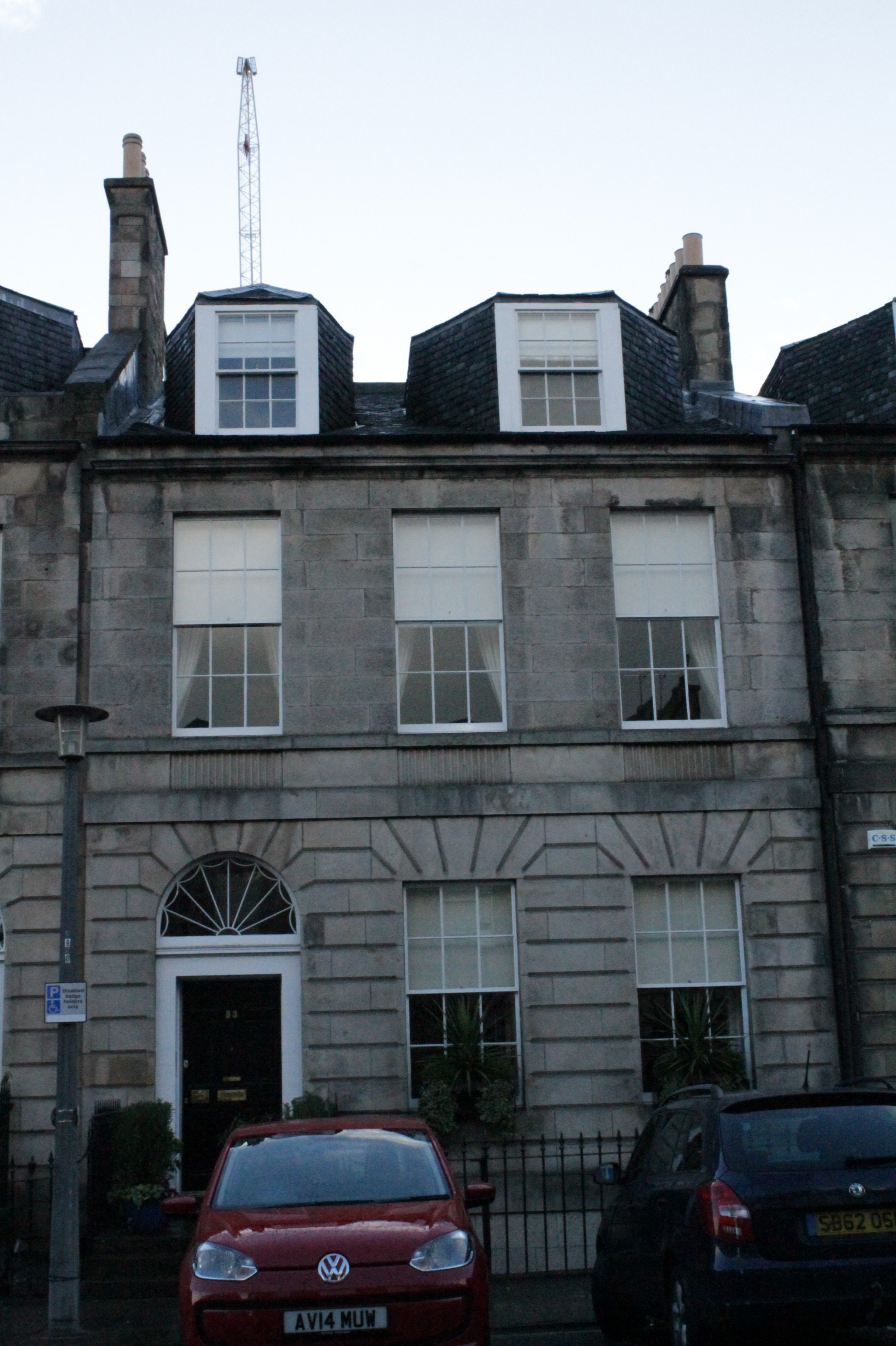
33 Albany Street, Edinburgh

He was born on 1 December 1801 at Post House Stair on Parliament Close off the Royal Mile in Edinburgh the son of Dr Andrew Inglis (d.1834) and grandson of Dr William Inglis. His house was remodelled and readdressed as 16 Parliament Square following the rebuilding of the law courts in Edinburgh.

His father served as President of the Royal College of Surgeons of Edinburgh from 1808 to 1810. His grandfather had served twice in this same role: 1782-1784 and 1790-1792.

Inglis studied medicine at the University of Edinburgh from around 1817 to 1821, gaining his doctorate (MD) in 1824.

His family home was destroyed in the Great Fire of Edinburgh in 1824. His family then relocated to a then-new townhouse at 11 Albany Street in Edinburgh's New Town. Inglis inherited the house on his father's death in 1834, and lived there for most of his life.

He was a member of the Medico-Chirurgical Society of Edinburgh from 1827 In 1833 Inglis was elected a member of the Harveian Society of Edinburgh and served as President in 1857. In 1853 he succeeded James Scarth Combe as President of the Royal College of Surgeons of Edinburgh. He was succeeded in turn in 1855 by Dr Andrew Wood.

He lived his later years at 33 Albany Street and died there in 1889.

== Family ==
He married Isabella Weir, daughter of Major James Weir and brother of Dr Thomas Graham Weir. They had at least eight children.
