= Linear Integrated Systems =

Linear Integrated Systems, Inc.
- Industry: Semiconductors
- Founded: 1987; 38 years ago
- Founder: John H. Hall
- Headquarters: Fremont, California, United States
- Key people: Cindy L. Johnson (CEO)
- Website: linearsystems.com

Linear Integrated Systems, Inc. (LIS) is an American full-service designer and manufacturer of small-signal, discrete semiconductors. It produces over 2,000 different discrete semiconductors, including dual- and single-junction field effect transistors (JFETs), bipolar transistors, BiFETs, lateral DMOS analog switch and switch arrays, and picoamp dual and single diodes.

== History ==
LIS was founded in 1987 by Silicon Valley pioneer John H. Hall after his departure from Micro Power Systems.

At LIS, Hall continued his research into refractory metal semiconductors and also designed custom integrated circuits (ICs) while developing a line of standard products. Featured among the standard products were improved versions of semiconductors Hall had invented during his years at Union Carbide, Intersil and Micro Power Systems.

By the 2000s, LIS had moved away from custom IC work to focus on small-signal, discrete components for use in the test/measurement, medical, high-end audio and sensor applications. In 2006, LIS announced the release of the LSK389 ultra-low-noise dual JFET.

LIS announced in 2013 the LSK489, a dual JFET that combines low capacitance with low noise similar to the LSK389.

Following Hall's death in late 2014, Timothy S. McCune was named president and a member of the board of directors of the company.

They also produce the 3N170, which was previously produced by Intersil and Motorola.
