= 3N170 =

The 3N170 is an enhancement mode N-Channel MOSFET standard product designed for use as a general purpose amplifier or switch. The part was produced previously by Intersil, Motorola, and others. It is currently produced by Linear Integrated Systems, Inc.

== Part characteristics ==
Characteristics include:

- Low switching voltages
- Fast switching times
- Low drain-source resistance
- Low reverse transfer capacitance
