= Jon Hall =

Jon Hall may refer to:

- Jon Hall (actor) (1915–1979), American film actor
- Jon Hall (basketball) (born 1982), British wheelchair basketball player
- Jon Hall (programmer) (born 1950), American programmer and executive director of Linux International
- Jon Hall (rugby union) (born 1962), English former rugby union player

== See also ==
- John Hall (disambiguation)
- Jonathan Hall (disambiguation)
