= Timothy S. McCune =

American business man

Timothy S. McCune (born March 30, 1963) is an American businessman and former journalist. He was former president of Integrated Wave Technologies, Inc. and former president of Linear Integrated Systems, Inc. He is currently a semiconductor industry consultant and author.

== Early life and education ==
McCune was born in Plainfield, New Jersey to Robert Franklin McCune and Mary Elizabeth (Maurer) McCune. Along with his sister, Barbara, the family moved to Sandwich, Illinois in 1967 when his father, a Bell Laboratories engineer, was transferred to the new Indian Hill research facility in Naperville, IL. McCune attended public schools in Sandwich, IL.

== Career ==
In 2004, McCune became president of Integrated Wave Technologies, Inc., a company founded in 1992 to combine the talents of Silicon Valley pioneer John H. Hall with former Soviet scientists who had worked with speech recognition. McCune oversaw several generations of system development, which led to successful deployment of devices in combat operations. IWT received US Air Force funding for an advanced version of the device that provided for limited recognition of foreign language responses. McCune traveled extensively in Iraq and Afghanistan to complete testing and development of IWT’s flagship product, the Voice Response Translator (VRT).

In 2010, McCune was named as sole inventor in a patent related to IWT’s work for DARPA, US Patent 7,707,035. DARPA in 2011 awarded IWT with a contract for the purchase of 2,000 licenses for the digital version of the highly successful VRT application for Android systems. This application, called “MilTrans,” was the first app completed for DARPA’s TransApps (Transformative Apps) program and available in its Mobilize App Store.

In 2014, McCune was named president of Linear Integrated Systems, Inc., after the death of company founder John H. Hall. At Linear Systems, McCune devised and led implementation of the first production-quantity sub-nanovolt testing capability. In 2024, McCune retired from Linear Systems to pursue other opportunities.

McCune published a novel in December 2017 based on his travels to Afghanistan and Russia entitled, “Last Call in Kabul.” The book peaked at No.1 on Kindle in the Russian Fiction subcategory and No. 8 in the War Fiction subcategory.

In July 2024, McCune accepted a position with Qorvo, a large semiconductor design and manufacturing company, to develop and implement new marketing strategies for its QSPICE circuit simulation software authored by Mike Engelhardt. He is a regular contributor to semiconductor and national security policy publications.
