= Great Fire of Edinburgh =

City fire in City of Edinburgh, Scotland

Coordinates: 55°56′59″N 3°11′22″W

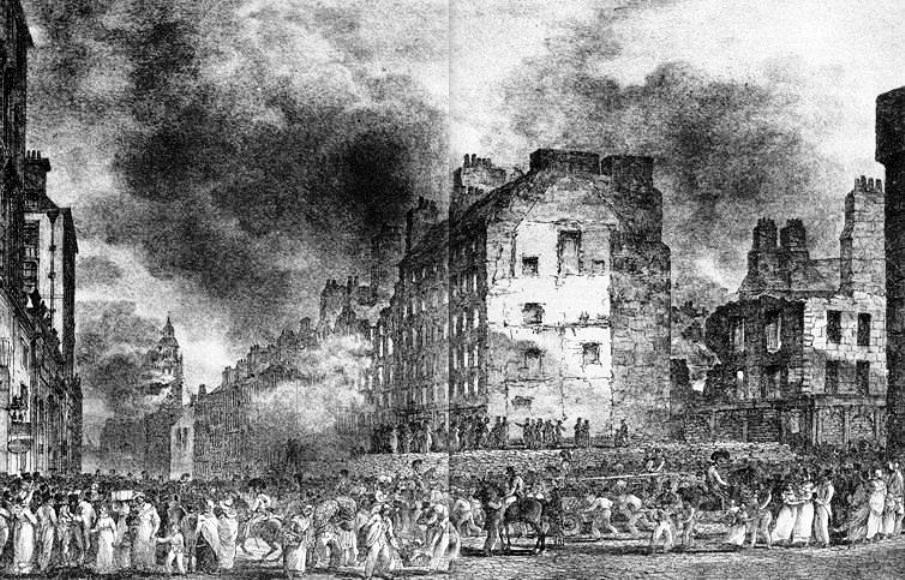
A contemporary illustration of the fire

The Great Fire of Edinburgh was one of the most destructive fires in the history of Edinburgh. It started on Monday, 15 November 1824, and lasted for five days, with two major phases.

== Sequence of events ==
The fire broke out around 10pm on 15 November 1824, in James Kirkwood's engraving workshop on the second floor of the Old Assembly Close, a narrow alleyway just off the High Street.

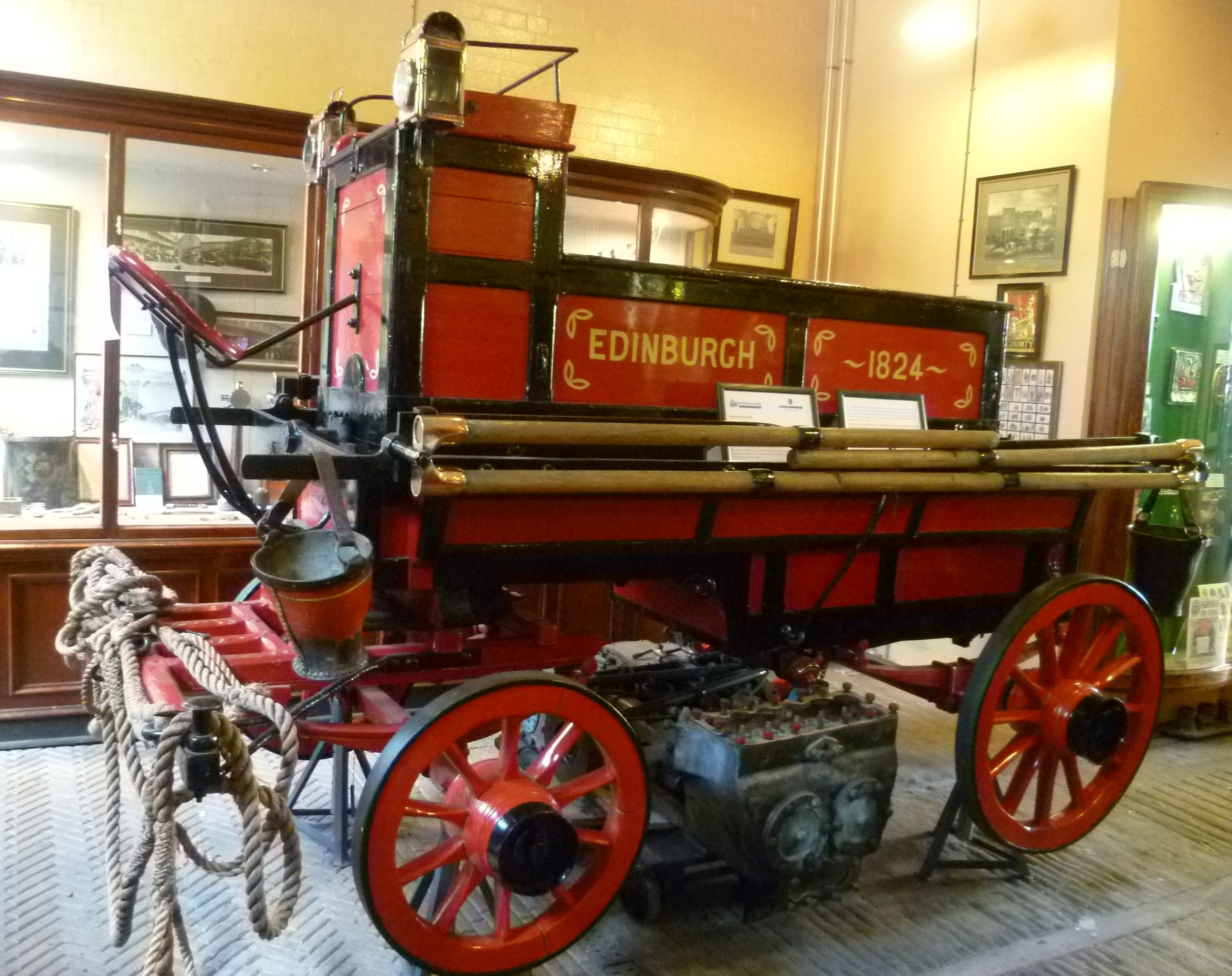
One of Edinburgh's earliest fire engines built in 1824

The city of Edinburgh had formed a permanent fire brigade only two months earlier under its new firemaster James Braidwood. Although this new force arrived quickly with their custom-built fire engines, they had difficulty locating a water supply and did not begin to tackle the blaze until 11pm, by which time six stories of the building were ablaze.

Due to the narrowness of the alleyway, the fire spread quickly to adjoining buildings, first affecting those to the east of Fishmarket Close and later spreading along the roofs of the High Street through embers carried by a southwesterly breeze. By midnight, four tenements were ablaze as the fire advanced towards the Cowgate. The Old Assembly Hall at the centre of the fire (which had given its name to the close) was destroyed during the night. Around midday on Tuesday, 16 November, the spire on the Tron Kirk caught fire and molten lead began to pour from its roof. Although firemen succeeded in reaching the roof of the church, the fierceness of the blaze forced them back.

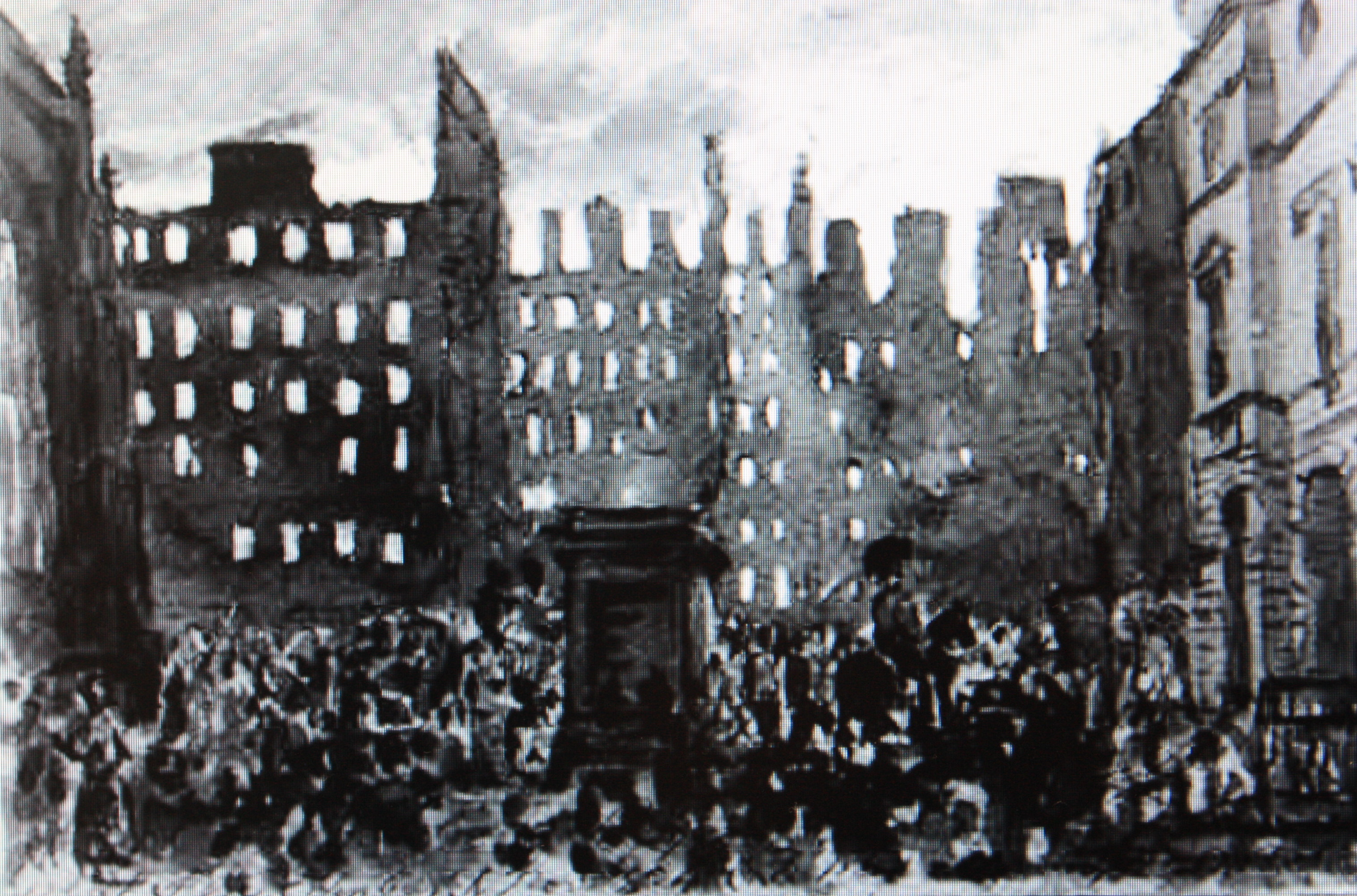
Great Fire of Edinburgh by D O Hill

At 10pm on Tuesday evening a secondary outbreak occurred in buildings on the corner of High Street and Parliament Close (renamed Parliament Square after the subsequent rebuilding of the affected area). This blaze started on the top floor of an eleven-story building overlooking the Cowgate. This led to claims of divine intervention and punishment from God, as well as deliberate fire-raising. It was more likely the result of a still smouldering ember. This second phase of the fire began to consume the buildings on the east side of Parliament Close. Efforts focused on saving the adjacent Parliament Hall and Law Courts, and stopping the fire leaping to St Giles Cathedral. A young David Octavius Hill made watercolour sketches during this second phase, viewing the fire from the west. By 5am on Wednesday 17 November, the fire was described as "grand and terrific". The building housing the Edinburgh Courant collapsed and the fire continued to spread down Conn's Close towards the Cowgate. Due mainly to a downpour of rain, the conflagration was brought under control by Wednesday evening, although small outbreaks continued and final smouldering did not cease until Friday, 19 November. Over the following days, engineers from the castle and navy were employed to pull down the highly unsafe remnants of buildings left precariously balanced along the closes.

The fire attracted huge crowds of spectators including a large number of Law Lords: Charles Hope, Lord Granton (Lord President of the Courts); John Boyle of Shewalton (Lord Justice Clerk); Sir William Rae of St Catherines (Lord Advocate); John Hope (Solicitor General, later Lord Hope); the Dean of Faculty; and Henry (later Lord) Cockburn.

== Total damage ==
- High Street (Royal Mile): four six-storey tenements fully lost plus upper storeys of buildings closer to the Tron Kirk damaged
- Conn's Close: two timber-framed 'lands' (tenements) of great antiquity destroyed completely
- Old Assembly Close: four seven-storey tenements lost and the Assembly Hall (a ballroom)
- Borthwick's Close: six tenements lost
- Old Fishmarket Close: four six-storey tenements lost and Neill & Co printworks
- Parliament Close: four double tenements of seven to eleven storeys destroyed, including the birthplace of James Boswell
- Office of the Edinburgh Courant newspaper destroyed
- John Kay's shop in Parliament Close destroyed
- Old Assembly Hall destroyed.
- Several printworks destroyed
- Notable residents who lost their home in the fire included Hector Gavin and Archibald Inglis

An estimated 400 homes were destroyed, with 400-500 families left homeless. Thirteen people died including those of two firemen and many people were injured. Historic homes destroyed included that of Robert Dundas of Arniston, the Elder and George Heriot.

== Aftermath ==
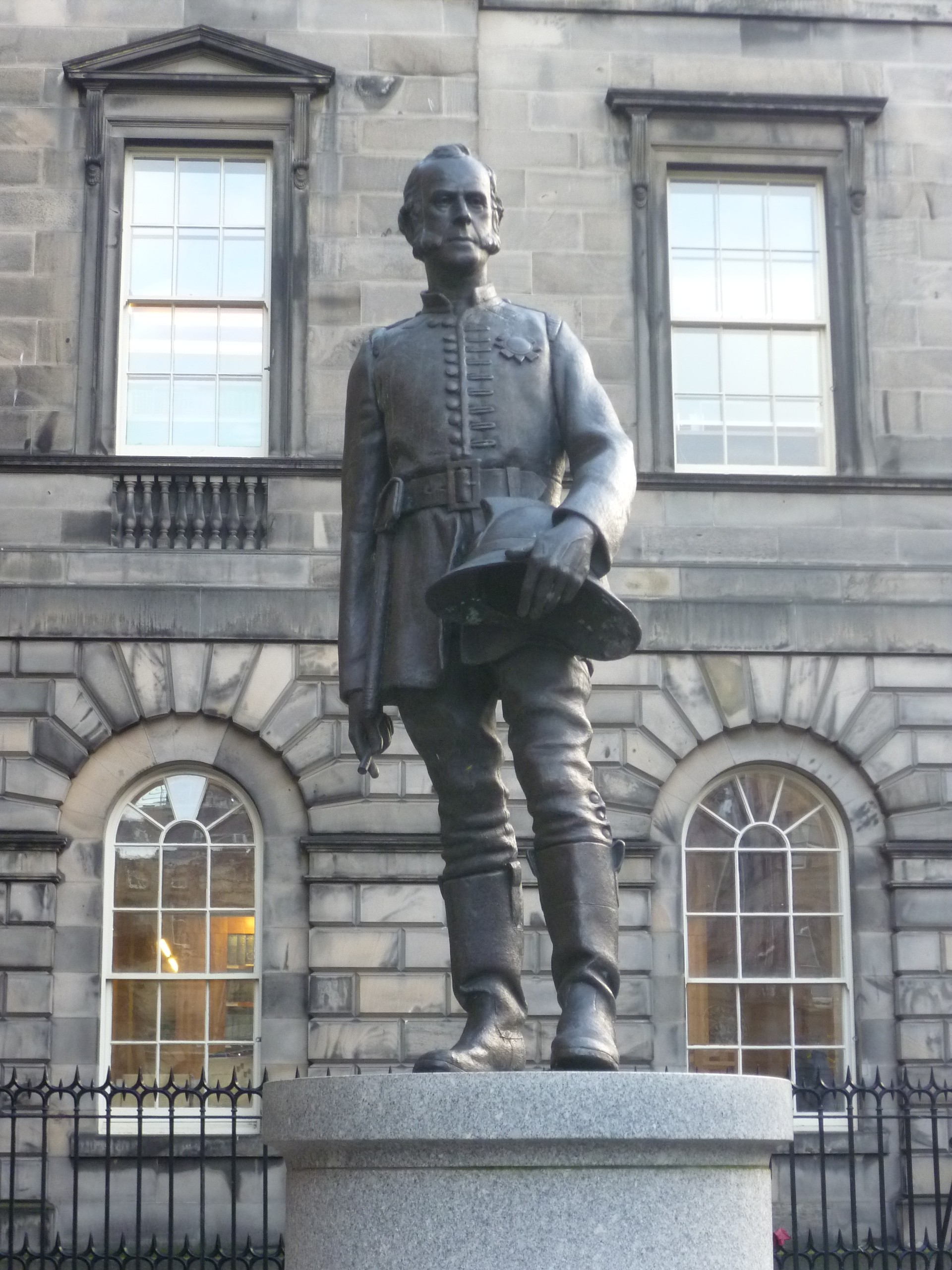
James Braidwood statue in Parliament Square

Amidst mounting public criticism of the new fire brigade and its young firemaster, an inquiry was held after the disaster. Braidwood and his "pioneers" (as the first firemen were called) were exonerated from all blame. The inquiry found that there had been confusion as to who had been in charge of the firefighting operation. Public officials (Bailies, Law Officers and "Gentlemen of Importance"), assuming authority under older municipal regulations, were found to have issued contradictory orders to the harassed firemen. This finding prompted the passing of a new regulation whereby the City Firemaster (or, in his absence, his Deputy) was to be given complete command of all firefighting operations, a ruling subsequently adopted throughout Britain's fire services. The inquiry also criticised the inadequate number of firecocks that had been available to the firefighters and recommended improvements. Within a year the number for the whole town was increased from 45 to 97, with 88 more following later. The brigade was also fully re-equipped.

The fire opened the way for a more formal completion of the Scottish Law Courts in Parliament Square. This had been proposed as early as 1807, but blocked since 1810 by owners on the east side of the square. The fire destroyed the buildings they had been trying to retain and may have been viewed as a "happy accident". The remodelling of the buildings was completed to the original plan in 1829.

The south side of the Royal Mile from the Tron Kirk to Parliament Square was rebuilt as a planned run of well-proportioned but plain five-storey Georgian tenements. Some of the eastern blocks, which suffered less fire damage, incorporated some earlier fabric such as turret stairs. To the west a large surviving building was nicknamed "Salamander Land" (due to the legend that salamanders can survive fire). This survived until the 1860s when it was replaced by the Police Chambers.

St. Giles Cathedral was refaced in ashlar a few years later (1829–33), partly to repair and conceal major scorching from the fire.

The steeple of the Tron Kirk was rebuilt in 1828, with a tall stone spire in the Wren style.

== Braidwood statue ==
In 2008, a statue of James Braidwood, master of the newly formed Edinburgh fire brigade which had fought the fire, was unveiled in Parliament Square. The spot was chosen to mark the stand made by the fire brigade to save St Giles Cathedral from more serious damage. The statue was created by the Glasgow sculptor, Kenneth Mackay, and paid for from a fund set up by the late Dr Frank Rushbrook CBE, then 93-year-old former Firemaster at Lothian & Borders Fire Brigade.
