= John Hall (cricketer, born 1950) =

English cricketer

Personal information
- Full name: John Edwin Hall
- Born: 5 January 1950 (age 76); Maseru, Basutoland
- Batting: Right-handed

Domestic team information
- Years: Team
- 1968–1971: Suffolk
- 1969–1970: Cambridge University

Career statistics
Competition	First-class
Matches	14
Runs scored	385
Batting average	14.80
100s/50s	–/2
Top score	69
Catches/stumpings	3/–
- Source: Cricinfo, 12 July 2019

John Edwin Hall (born 5 January 1950) is an English former first-class cricketer.

Hall was born at Maseru in British Basutoland. He later attended the University of Cambridge in England. While studying at Cambridge, he made his debut in first-class cricket for Cambridge University against Nottinghamshire at Fenner's in 1969. He played first-class cricket for Cambridge until 1970, making a further thirteen appearances. He scored 385 runs at an average of 14.80, with a high score of 69. In addition to playing first-class cricket, Hall also played minor counties cricket for Suffolk between 1969–71, making 27 appearances in the Minor Counties Championship.
