= Jack Hall (footballer, born 1890) =

English footballer

Personal information
- Full name: Joseph Edward Hall
- Date of birth: 16 December 1895 (ENFA)
- Place of birth: Boldon, County Durham, England
- Date of death: 1957 (ENFA)
- Position: Full back

Senior career*
Years	Team	Apps	(Gls)
1909–1910	Preston North End	0	(0)
- Jarrow Croft
1910–1911	Hull City	0	(0)
1911–1913	Barnsley	5	(0)
1913–1915	Manchester City	1	(0)
1919–1920	Darlington		
1920–1922	Bristol Rovers	30	(0)
1922–192?	Newport County	0	(0)
- Bristol Aeroplane Company
- * Club domestic league appearances and goals

Joseph Edward "Jack" Hall (1890 – after 1945) was an English footballer who played as a full back in the Football League for Barnsley, Manchester City and Bristol Rovers. He was on the books of Preston North End, Hull City and Newport County, without playing league football for any of them, and also played non-league football for clubs including Jarrow Croft and Darlington.
