= John Hall (British Army officer) =

British army officer

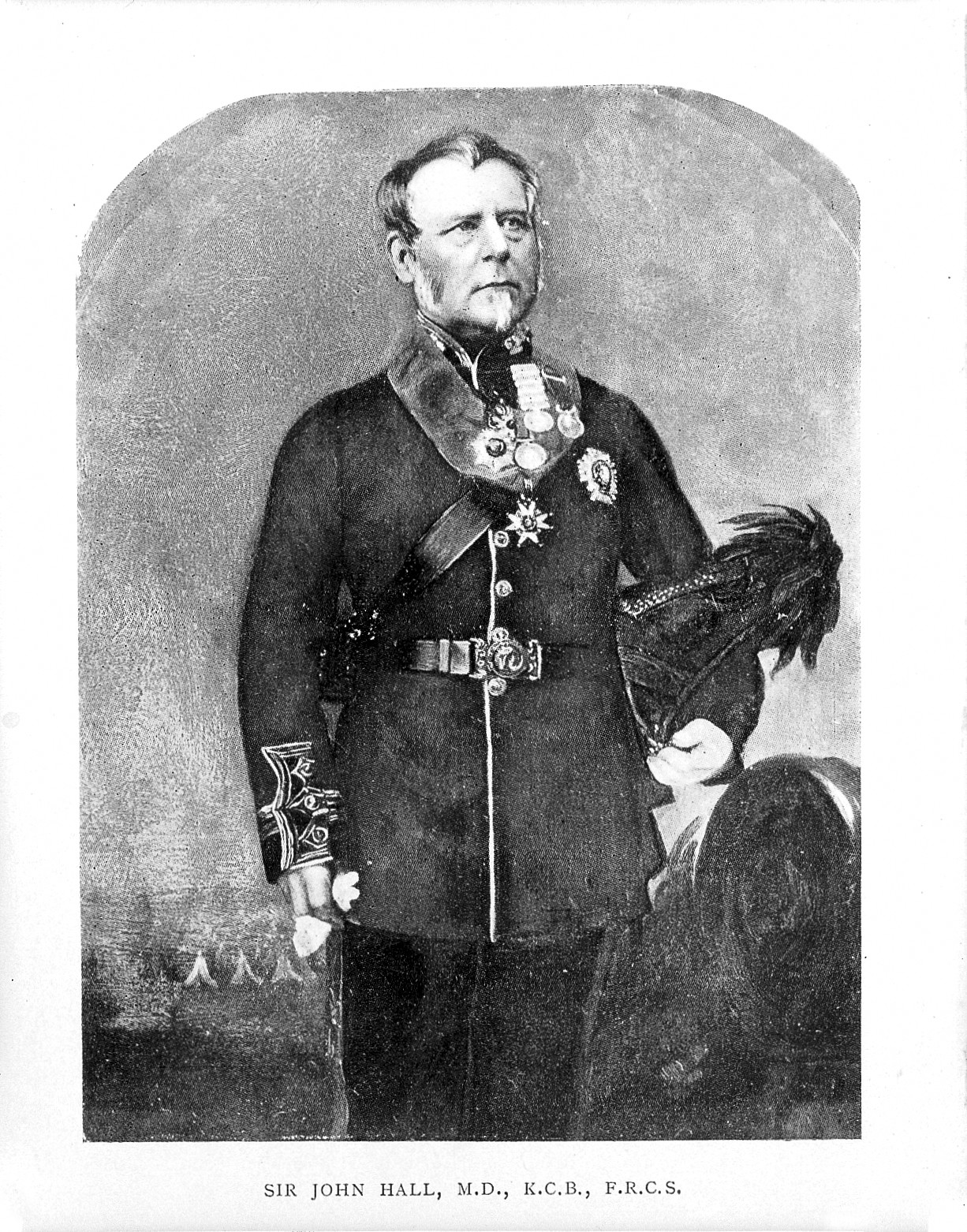
Portrait of John Hall

Sir John Hall KCB (1795 in Little Beck, Westmorland – 17 January 1866 in Pisa) was a British military surgeon.

Studying at Guy's Hospital and St Thomas's Hospital, he joined the Army Medical Service in June 1815, being posted to Flanders just in time for the final stages of the Waterloo campaign. He then served in Jamaica (1818-1827 and 1841–44), Ireland (from 1835 to 1836, and in 1844), Spain and Gibraltar (1836–39), South Africa (1847-51, during the Cape frontier wars) and Bombay (1851–54).

He was ordered from Bombay straight to the Crimea for the Crimean War in 1854, with the rank of Inspector-General of Hospitals, to head its main receiving hospital at Scutari during that campaign. In that role he came into contact and conflict with Florence Nightingale (whom he called in his letters a "petticoat imperieuse"), though he fully welcomed the help offered by Mary Seacole. He considered that Nightingale's authority as "Superintendent of the Female Nursing Establishment in the English General Military Hospitals in Turkey" extended solely to Turkey and not the entire war zone, and he actively conspired with Mother Mary Francis Bridgeman of the Irish Sisters of Mercy to evade Nightingale's authority by transferring her and the nursing nuns under her to the Crimea without consulting Nightingale.

He returned from the Crimea in 1856, and retired a year later. Though his actions in the Crimea led to his being mentioned in dispatches, becoming a KCB and officer of the Légion d'honneur, and receiving the third class of the Turkish order of the Mejidiye, he also faced criticism for them. Nightingale, who acknowledged his efficiency and ability but regarded him as a wily opponent to her nursing experiment, referred to him as "Knight of the Crimean Burying-Grounds."

The ‘Observations on the Report of the Sanitary Commission despatched to the Seat of the War in the East,’ that he published in 1857 brought him into conflict with John Sutherland and Nightingale, since (with one other pamphlet by Hall) they were intended to rebut her criticisms of his organisation of the army hospitals. Intending to spend his retirement in India writing a medical history of the Crimean campaign, he was left part-paralysed by a stroke and gave up the intended book, touring Europe instead for the remainder of his life.
