= John H. Hall (inventor) =

American inventor

John Haslett Hall (11 July 1932 – 31 October 2014) was a pioneer in the development of low power CMOS integrated circuits. Hall was a pioneering semiconductor process and device design expert. He founded or co-founded multiple innovative Silicon Valley companies, including Intersil, MicroPower Systems, Linear Integrated Systems, Inc., and Integrated Wave Technologies, Inc.

Over the course of his career, Hall received at least 21 patents covering advanced semiconductor processes and designs. Hall was a protégé of Dr. Jean Hoerni, one of the “Traitorous Eight” who left Shockley Semiconductor Laboratory and co-founded rival Fairchild Semiconductor. In turn, many of Hall's former employees such as David Fullagar went on to become major Silicon Valley contributors.

The San Francisco Chronicle in 1992 referred to Hall as “one of Silicon Valley’s unsung innovators.”

== Early life ==
Hall was born on July 11, 1932, in Washington County, Ohio to a family of engineers and manufacturers, including the founders and owners of the Hall Grindstone Company. Opting after high school to join the Navy, he worked as an enlisted electronics technician on aircraft systems development and testing.

== Early career ==
In 1961, Hall graduated from the University of Cincinnati and went to work for Rockwell on the Minuteman missile program and Honeywell on the YF-11 Blackbird onboard IC-based computer. While working on these projects, Hall met Jean Hoerni. Hoerni at the time was vice president and general manager of Teledyne, Inc.’s Amelco Semiconductor and working with Union Carbide to start its nascent semiconductor operation.

== Career ==
Hoerni left Amelco to work directly for Union Carbide as a consulting engineer and asked Hall to join him there. From 1962 to 1967 Hall was Union Carbide’s director of IC development. Hall’s first patent, filed in 1966 while working for Jean Hoerni at Union Carbide as the company’s Director of Integrated Circuit Development, involved the invention of a sputtering process to create gold contacts in a molybdenum-based semiconductor. Over the course of his career, Hall received at least 21 patents covering advanced semiconductor processes and designs. Hall was a protégé of Dr. Jean Hoerni, one of the “Traitorous Eight” who left Shockley Semiconductor Laboratory and co-founded rival Fairchild Semiconductor. In turn, many of Hall's former employees such as David Fullagar went on to become major Silicon Valley contributors.

Hall's most important development at Union Carbide involved the creation of thin film resistors. This development formed the basis for integrated circuits used in the first electronic watches and other low-power devices.

In 1963, Hall designed and oversaw the construction of Union Carbide's Mountain View semiconductor plant, a facility that became Intel Corporation's first manufacturing location. When Hoerni founded Intersil in 1967, he again asked Hall to join him. At Intersil, Hall invented the first practical complementary metal oxide semiconductor (CMOS) process using phosphorus glass to coat silicon oxide gates. This process enabled ICs to run at 1.2 volts versus the then-current industry standard of 8 to 10 volts. Chips made using this process would last vastly longer than those requiring the higher voltage.

At Intersil, Hoerni, a Swiss native, received venture funding from Swiss watchmaker Omega to develop a wristwatch IC. Though Hoerni and Hall created a successful design, Omega decided not to put it into production. Hoerni went to Japan and received an order for the watch chips from Seiko Chairman Shoji Hattori. Seiko used these chips to create the world's first quartz watch, the “Astron”, in 1969. Hattori, recognizing the potential of this design and future ones, funded Hall's start-up company, Micro Power Systems (MPS), in 1971. MPS was the first company where Hall served as the chief executive officer.

Hall's developments at MPS included the development of the world's first computerized programmable heart pacemaker for Medtronics after competing for the project with Motorola and Texas Instruments. Hall also led the development of radar control modules for the B-1B bomber.

Among Hall's most important inventions, recognized in a patent granted in 1974, was his silicon-oxy-nitride process for producing more stable MOS transistors. This process was superior to the silicon-nitride process then in use and became an industry standard.

In 1978, in recognition of Hall's achievements in the semiconductor industry, the University of Cincinnati recognized him as one of its Distinguished Alumni.

MPS and Hall were planning an initial public offering in 1986, but Hall had a falling out with Seiko's management. Hall's $110 million wrongful termination suit was settled for a much smaller amount of money and Hall gaining the right to use patents he had received during his time at MPS.

Refractory metals such as molybdenum formed the basis for some of Hall's most significant work and later patents. Hall conceived a “merged gate” technology that would dramatically increase the speed of integrated circuits without requiring expensive reductions in semiconductor feature size.

In 1987, Hall founded Linear Integrated Systems, Inc., (LIS) a company he led until his death in 2014. LIS developed advanced custom ICs for specific customers, including an advanced hearing aid device, but has more recently focused on small signal discrete semiconductors, particularly ultra-low-noise junction field effect transistors (JFETs).

In 1993, while continuing to lead LIS, Hall founded Integrated Wave Technologies, Inc. (IWT) to combine the talents of former Soviet speech recognition engineers he had met with his experience in developing small, low-power electronic devices. Hall conceived of using the compact, effective speech recognition algorithms developed by these scientists in miniaturized, low-power, special-purpose computers. In 2004, Hall hired Timothy S. McCune to lead IWT after McCune had assisted him as a business development consultant for the prior 10 years.

Under a series of Justice Department, Navy and DARPA contracts, IWT developed the Voice Response Translator (VRT) to meet the need for law enforcement and military voice-to-voice translation requirements. Using this approach, the VRT outperformed competing systems in combat operations. With the VRT as its key product, IWT in 2008 was named by Inc Magazine as the 200th Fasting Growing Company in the U.S.

Hall continued to produce advanced semiconductors at LIS until his death in 2014. His last development was the LSK489, a JFET that combined ultra-low noise with low input capacitance, useful qualities for audio and other applications.
