= Retirement in India =

VRS applies to employees who have completed 10 years of service or are above the age of 40 years. It applies to workers, executives of companies and/or to an authority of a co-operative society (except company/co-operative society directors). As per the rules, voluntary retirement scheme should result in an overall reduction in the existing strength of employees and the vacancy cannot be filled up. PSUs have to obtain prior approval of the government before offering voluntary retirement. Firms can frame different schemes, however, they must conform to the guidelines under section 2BA of the Income-Tax Rules. One of the pertinent rules clearly states that retiring employee must not be employed in another firm belonging to the same management.

Retirement in India includes all the culture around retirement in India.

Various organizations offer "voluntary retirement schemes" (VRS) as part of their strategy to have turnover of employees.

Indian culture has a traditional concept that retirement can include sannyasa, which is a phase of life for focusing on spiritual development.

A 2013 report found that there is trend for people to be worked till older age.

A 2001 report described high diversity in expectations of retirement across generations and urban versus rural life.

A 2016 report described that when professional and highly trained women retire they are likely to join volunteer service to benefit the public.

== See also ==
- Pensions in India
