= Athletic Brewing Company =

U.S. non-alcoholic craft beer manufacturer

- Industry: Non-alcoholic craft beer
- Founded: 2017
- Founder: Bill Shufelt; John Walker
- Headquarters: Milford, Connecticut, USA
- Products: Non-alcoholic beer; Sparkling water
- Website: https://athleticbrewing.com/

Athletic Brewing Company is a U.S. manufacturer of non-alcoholic craft beer. Based in Milford, Connecticut, the company was founded in 2017 by Bill Shufelt and John Walker. In 2022, the company's sales represented nearly half of all non-alcoholic craft beer sold in the US. Athletic became America's largest brewing company that focused exclusively on non-alcoholic beer. Athletic Brewing Company also manufactures sparkling water under the brand name "Daypack."

== History ==
Bill Shufelt was a trader at a hedge fund and an ultramarathon runner who stopped drinking alcohol in 2013. Finding non-alcoholic drinks to be unsatisfactory, he sought out John Walker, a head brewer from Santa Fe to produce better tasting non-alcohol beers. They developed a brewing method that fully ferments the beers, but only to less than 0.5% ABV, the limit at which a beer can be considered non-alcoholic in the United States. Shufelt stated that no alcohol is removed after brewing nor is any other ingredient added, unlike other non-alcoholic beers. After devising this brewing method, they founded Athletic Brewing in 2017 and established the first brewing facility dedicated to non-alcoholic beer in Stratford, Connecticut, which opened in May 2018.

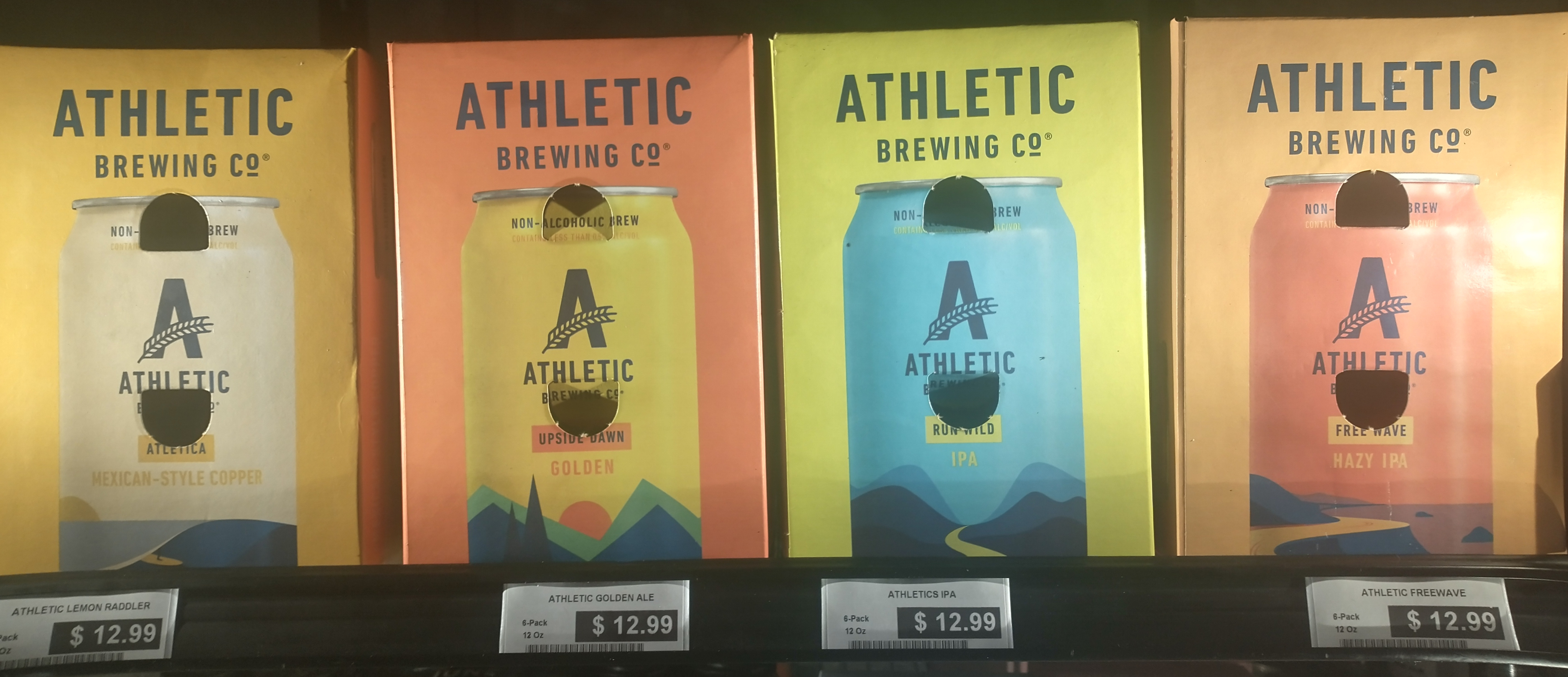
Athletic Brewing Company beverages for sale in the refrigerated section of a package store.

Athletic Brewing was launched commercially in 2018, initially with two beers, Run Wild IPA and Upside Dawn Golden Ale. It marketed itself as a health conscious drink for athletes with an active lifestyle, and it established a presence in athletic events. It began selling the beers in seven stores in New England on a trial basis, before it expanded to all the states in the US, and then other countries around the world. Athletic's sales grew from $2.5 million in 2019 to about $15 million in 2020, increasing by about 500% and achieved a 61% market share of the non-alcoholic craft beer market in the U.S. It achieved sales of nearly $37 million from over 100,000 barrels of beer in 2021 (up from 37,500 in 2020). It was ranked the second-fastest growing food and beverage company (and 26th overall) in the U.S. in 2022 by Inc., as well as one of the 100 most influential companies of 2022 by Time magazine.

In 2020, Athletic added a second manufacturing location when it purchased a brewing facility in San Diego, California from Ballast Point Brewing Company. In 2022, it opened a 150,000 square foot brewing facility in Milford, Connecticut, that is capable of producing 6 million cases annually. It purchased a second Ballast Point brewing facility 107,000 sq. ft. in size in San Diego in 2024. Athletic had the capacity to produce 1.2 million barrels of beer per year by 2025.

In 2022, Keurig Dr Pepper took a $50 million minority stake in Athletic Brewing. The company was the first non-alcoholic beer maker to make the list of top 50 craft brewing companies by sales volume in the US in 2022, placing at No. 27. It rose further to No. 13 in 2023, and No. 8 in 2024. It was also ranked the no. 18 overall brewing companies in 2024. It was the second biggest non-alcoholic beer in the US in 2023, and it became the No. 1 non-alcoholic beer brand by sales in U.S. grocery stores by early 2024, overtaking Heineken and Budweiser. It produced nearly 400,000 barrels of beer in 2024.

Athletic's investors include a number of athletes and celebrities, including pro football players J. J. Watt and Justin Tuck, Momofuku founder David Chang, cyclist Lance Armstrong, and Toms Shoes founder Blake Mycoskie.

== Awards ==
In 2020, Athletic's Free Wave IPA won the award as Supreme Champion Beer at the International Beer Challenge, the first non-alcoholic beer to win the award, beating over 500 other entries. The beer also took the title for Best No & Low Alcohol Beer, and Athletic itself was declared Brewer of the Year for North America. Its beers have won at the World Beer Awards, US Open Beer Championship, Great American Beer Festival, and Best of Craft Beer Awards. Its Run Wild IPA was named the US winner of 2020 World Beer Award in the Pale Beer category, and the Best Non-Alcoholic Beer in the inaugural Tasting Alliance World Beer Competition in 2022. The company was included in 2024 list of influential companies compiled by Time. In 2026, Forbes ranked Athletic Brewing Company No. 99 on its annual America's Best Startup Employers list.

== Other products ==
Athletic Brewing also sells hop water under the brand name "Daypack." The company began selling the product in 2021 as an "alternative to soda or other sugary beverages."
