= Jonathan Hall (cricketer) =

English cricketer

Personal information
- Full name: Jonathan Roger Hall
- Born: 3 September 1962 (age 64); Hampstead, London, England
- Batting: Right-handed
- Bowling: Right-arm medium

Domestic team information
- Years: Team
- 1988–1991: Dorset

Career statistics
Competition	List A
Matches	3
Runs scored	43
Batting average	14.33
100s/50s	0/0
Top score	17
Balls bowled	72
Wickets	1
Bowling average	81.00
5 wickets in innings	0
10 wickets in match	0
Best bowling	1/16
Catches/stumpings	0/–
- Source: Cricinfo, 17 March 2010

Jonathan Roger Hall (born 3 September 1962) is a former English List A cricketer. Hall was a right-handed batsman who bowled right-arm medium pace. He was the co-founder, with Julian Millichamp, of cult cricket bat manufacturers Millichamp & Hall, operating in Perth, Western Australia, and Somerset, England. The company was sold to Puma Australia in 1994.

Hall made his debut for Dorset in the 1988 Minor Counties Championship against Shropshire. From 1988 to 1991 Hall represented Dorset in 18 Minor Counties matches, with his final match for the county coming against Oxfordshire. He also played on numerous occasions for Somerset 2nd XI.

Hall also played three List A matches for Dorset, with his debut List A match coming against Kent in the 1st round of the 1989 NatWest Trophy. Hall played 2 further List A matches for Dorset, with his final List A match for the county coming in the 1st round of the 1991 NatWest Trophy against Lancashire.

Hall is now a screenwriter for television and short films.
