= John Hall (West Virginia politician) =

American politician

Member of the Virginia Senate from the Mason County district
- In office January 12, 1852 – December 2, 1855
- Preceded by: Evermont Ward
- Succeeded by: Fleet Smith

Member of the Virginia House of Delegates from the Mason and Jackson Counties, Virginia district
- In office December 2, 1844 – November 20, 1845
- Preceded by: John Armstrong
- Succeeded by: Spencer Adams

Personal details
- Born: April 1805 Ireland
- Died: April 30, 1881 (aged 76) Mason County, West Virginia
- Spouse: Olivia Hogg
- Profession: farmer, sheriff, politician

John Hall (April 1805 – April 11, 1881), born in Ireland, became a farmer, local sheriff and politician, and possibly the wealthiest man in Mason County (which became part of the state of West Virginia in part through his efforts). However, in October 1862 he killed another West Virginia founder, local newspaper editor Lewis Wetzel, because he was displeased with a publication, which ended his political career.

== Early and family life ==
John Hall Jr. was born in Tyrone County, Ireland, and was an infant when his father John Hall Sr. brought his family to Rockingham County, Virginia. He was still a boy when the family (including his brother James) moved to Mason County (then in Virginia). He never received a formal education, but learned to read and educated himself. He married Olivia Hogg, daughter of a local planter and granddaughter of Peter Hogg (a frontier surveyor and justice of the peace. They had ten children, although only one daughter would survive the long-lived father.

== Career ==
By age 18, Hall had become a local deputy sheriff, and was elected the county sheriff in 1833, defeating John Hereford but only serving a single year before Hereford's re-election.

In 1840, he owned six slaves, one woman older than 36, a young woman between 10 and 23 years old, and two young men of that category and two boys under 10. This number grew to eight slaves in 1850 (possibly the same two women and an infant girl, as well as two young boys), and decreased to five slaves (a 42-year-old woman; boys of 16, 13 and 6; and a 10-year-old girl) in 1860.

Meanwhile, in 1844 Hall was elected to the Virginia House of Delegates, but only served a single term. In 1851, voters from Mason, Jackson, Cabell, Wayne and Wirt counties elected Hall as a Whig to represent them (still part-time) in the Virginia Senate.

After Virginia voted to secede from the Union (although 90% of voters in the western counties, including Mason County, had voted against the measure), John Hall was elected one of nearby Putnam County's delegates to the Wheeling Convention which led to formation of the new state. Mason County voters on October 23, 1861, voted 804 to 83 to form the new state. Hall later became one of Mason County's delegates to the Constitutional Convention to form the new state. In fact, fellow delegates elected him as the convention's president, and their output won overwhelming approval on April 11, 1862 (18,162 for and 514 against). After overcoming certain objections in the U.S. Congress, President Abraham Lincoln signed the bill authorizing the new state on December 31, 1862, and Hall again convened the convention which addressed those required changes on February 12, 1863, although Hall was unable to attend (because of the Wetzel incident below). Judge Abraham Soper of Tyler County chaired the sessions of the reconvened convention. Voters approved the result on March 26, 1863, and President Lincoln declared its compliance on April 20, 1863, so statehood became effective in sixty days.

Meanwhile, both Hall's sons, VMI graduates who became Lt.Col. James R. Hall (1837-1864) and Major John Thomas Hall(1844-1862) would enlist in the Union Army, serving in the 4th West Virginia and 13th West Virginia respectively. Both died in the conflict, Major Hall during a skirmish at Beech Creek in what would become Mingo County, West Virginia, and Lt.Col. Hall during the Union victory at the Battle of Cedar Creek on October 19, 1864.

On October 23, 1862 (barely a month after the Battle of Antietam and West Virginia's bloodiest battle the Battle of Shepherdstown and the day before President Lincoln relieved Gen. Don Carlos Buell of command for failing to pursue CSA Gen. Braxton Bragg following the victory at the Battle of Perryville, Kentucky's bloodiest battle), John Hall shot and killed Lewis Wetzel, editor of the Point Pleasant Register. Wetzel (1825-1862) had been one of Mason County's delegates to the Wheeling Convention the previous year and continued to serve at all sessions until his murder. Hall was upset at an article and some called him in his "dotage". He was convicted of manslaughter due to his mental upset. Although his political career ended, he became a member of the Presbyterian Church and served as an elder.

== Death and legacy ==
Hall reportedly never recovered from his sons' deaths in the conflict and died of eye cancer in 1881, survived by one daughter and grandchildren, and was buried beside his wife in the Hogg family cemetery in Mason County. West Virginia erected a highway marker in his honor.
