= Bound Brook Island =

Island in Massachusetts, United States

- Location within Massachusetts Location within the United States

Geography
- Coordinates: 41°57′20″N 70°03′58″W
- Highest elevation: 79 ft (24.1 m)

Administration
- United States
- State: Massachusetts
- Location: Cape Cod

Bound Brook Island is an island in Barnstable County, Massachusetts. It is located between Bound Brook and Duck Harbor, 2 miles (3.2 km) northwest of Wellfleet in the Town of Wellfleet. Great Beach Hill is located south of Bound Brook Island. Bound Brook formerly made an island of this land during the spring and fall tides.
