= LSK489 =

Monolithic N-Channel junction-gate field-effect transistor

The LSK489 is a monolithic N-Channel JFET designed and built by Linear Integrated Systems, Inc.LIS Inc, a Fremont, CA company. The part was introduced in 2013 and was named by EDN Tech as one of the “2013 EDN Hot 100” electronics industry innovations for the year. In a product review published earlier that year, EDN noted: This JFET is part of a family of ultra-low-noise, dual JFET.

This JFET is part of a family of ultra-low-noise, dual JFETs specifically designed to provide users better-performing, wider bandwidths and cheaper solutions for obtaining tighter IDSS (drain-source saturation current) matching and better thermal tracking than matching individual JFETs. The company also has an in-house fab which is an indication that it can maintain good process control over production lots by tweaking the process as needed in real time as well as monitoring production to increase it for high volume demand customer needs.

== Part characteristics ==
The LSK489 is an N-channel monolithic dual JFET with 1.8 nV per square root Hz noise at 1 kHz and low-capacitance (Ciss= 4pF). The part is not graded with respect to IDSS, with the typical value being 5 mA, a low of 2.5 mA and a high of 15 mA. Characteristics include:

- Tight differential voltage match vs. current;
- Improved op amp speed settling time accuracy;
- Minimum Input Error trimming error voltage;
- Lower intermodulation distortion.

The part achieves very low noise with respect to its transconductance, which is attributed to the producer's ability to eliminate almost all of the generation-recombination noise usually present in JFETs. The part is available in TO-71, SOIC-A, and SOT-23 packages, as well as bare die.

== Related parts ==
The LSK489 (N-Channel Monolithic Dual JFET) and LSJ689 (P-Channel Monolithic Dual JEFT), also produced by Linear Integrated Systems, are complementary pairs. These two parts are the only complementary dual JFETs pair currently in production. The LSK489 is similar in electrical performance when compared to the LS843 series and the U401-403 series (Siliconix), the LSK489 has superior noise characteristics. It has slightly higher noise than the LSK389 (1.8 nV vs. 0.9 nV) but lower CISS (4pF vs. 20pF).

== Applications ==
The LSK489 is used in a wide range of front-end signal chain applications, including audio preamps, piezoelectric element preamps and photodiode preamps. The part is also used in high-end sensor systems ranging from hydrophones to the front end of the Large Synoptic Survey Telescope (LSST) being developed by SLAC National Accelerator Laboratory.
