= John Hall (cricketer, born 1934) =

English cricketer (1934–2003)

John Keith Hall (29 July 1934 – 13 July 2003) was an English cricketer active from 1958 to 1962 who played for Surrey and Sussex. He appeared in 21 first-class matches as a righthanded batsman who bowled right arm fast medium. He scored 57 runs with a highest score of 22 and took 54 wickets with a best performance of five for 30. Hall was born in West Wickham on 29 July 1934, and died in Spain on 13 July 2003, at the age of 68.
