= John Sutherland (physician) =

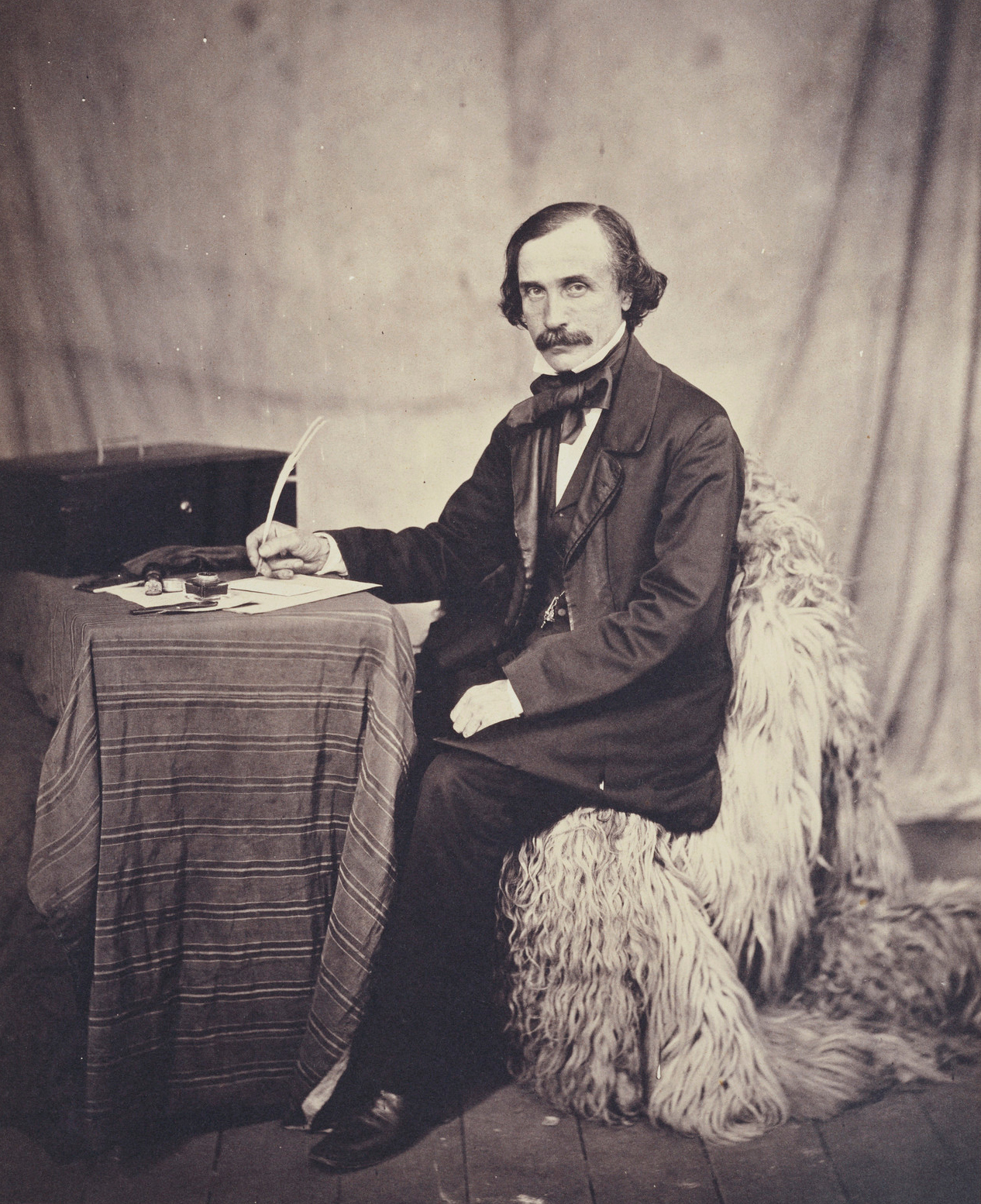
John Sutherland in 1855, by Roger Fenton

John Sutherland (December 1808 – 14 July 1891) was a physician and promoter of sanitary science.

Sutherland was born in Edinburgh, where he completed his high school studies. He became a licentiate of the Royal College of Surgeons of Edinburgh in 1827, and graduated M.D. at the university in 1831.

He was married to Sarah Elizabeth Cowie (1808–95), daughter of a Lancashire merchant. There were no children. Mrs Sutherland became a friend of Florence Nightingale, and assisted her with practical matters, when he became Nightingale's closest collaborator. Mrs Sutherland shared their concerns about public health; she was an active member of the Ladies' Sanitary Association.

After spending much time on the continent he practised for a short period in Liverpool, where he edited 'The Liverpool Health of Towns' Advocate' in 1846. In 1848, at the request of the Earl of Carlisle, he entered the public service as an inspector under the first board of health. He conducted several special inquiries, notably one into the cholera epidemic of 1848–9 (Parl. Papers, 1850 No. 1273, 1852 No. 1523). He was the head of a commission sent to foreign countries to inquire into the law and practice of burial. In 1851, Sutherland was appointed as the British medical delegate to the first International Sanitary Conference (aka Cholera Conference or Quarantine Conference). Louis Napoleon conferred him the Order of the Legion of Honour for services in producing a new International Sanitary Regulation.

In 1855 he was engaged at the Home Office in bringing into operation the act for abolishing intramural interments (ib. 1856, No. 146). He was also doing duty in the reorganised general board of health when, at the request of Lord Palmerston and Lord Panmure, he became the head of the Sanitary Commission sent to the Crimean War to deal with the massive sanitary defects of the war hospitals. This commission's mandate was not only to investigate but to implement changes. It started work in March 1855 on the worst Scutari hospitals and succeeded in bringing down the death rates. With Sutherland was a leading civil engineer, Robert Rawlinson, and members of the pioneering Sanitary Department at Liverpool, who did the cleaning out of the sewers and drains. On 25 August 1855 he came to England for consultation, and was summoned to Balmoral to inform the Queen of the steps that had been taken for the benefit of the troops. After the war he and Nightingale, with many others, tried to get the planned Royal Victoria Hospital at Netley cancelled (it was drastically redesigned). He and Nightingale jointly produced a confidential report on it for the war secretary.

He took an active part in the preparation of the report of the royal commission on the health of the army dated 1858 (ib. 1857–58, No. 2318), and also of the report on the state of the army in India, dated 19 May 1863 (ib. 1863, No. 3184). Both reports were of vast importance to the welfare of the soldiers, and most of Sutherland's recommendations were carried out. One of these was the appointment of the barrack and hospital improvement commission, with Sidney Herbert as president and Captain (afterwards Sir) Douglas Galton, Dr. Burrell of the army medical department, and Sutherland as members. This committee visited every barrack and hospital in the United Kingdom, and the sanitary arrangements of each were reported on. Defects were brought to light and remedied, and the health of the troops consequently improved (ib. 1861, No. 2839). Subsequently, Dr. Sutherland and Captain Galton visited and made reports on the Mediterranean stations, including the Ionian Islands (ib. 1863, No. 3207).

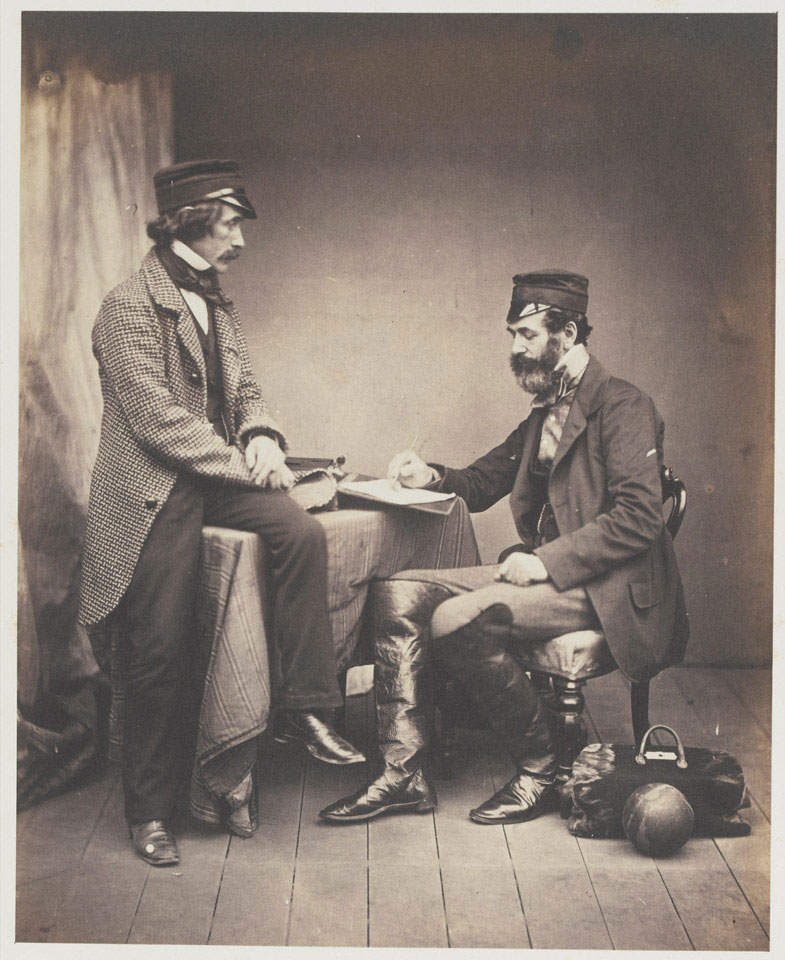
Dr Sutherland and Robert Rawlinson, The Sanitary Commission, Crimea 1855

As a member of the Royal Commission on the Crimean War, Sutherland worked up the considerable amount of evidence for it. He also gave his own evidence to it. He then became the "active member" of the four sub-commissions set up within the War Office, after the Crimean War, to ensure that the recommendations of the Royal Commission were implemented. Further, again according to Nightingale, not only was he a member of the Royal Commission on India, he "wrote nearly the whole" of the report on it. That work benefited as well as the British Army, "the whole native population—all that has been done for them sprang from this commission".

In 1862 the barrack and hospital improvement commission was reconstituted with the quartermaster-general as president and Sutherland as a prominent member. The title was altered to the army sanitary committee in 1865 (ib. 1865, No. 424). Two Indian officers were added, and all sanitary reports were submitted to the committee and suggestions for improving Indian stations prepared. This arrangement remained in force until Sutherland's retirement on 30 June 1888, when he was appointed a medical superintending inspector-general of the board of health and home office. Nightingale considered that Dr Sutherland received so little recognition for his work: no honours from the UK, although the French gave him the Legion of Honour. Nightingale and Sutherland formed an effective public health reform team. They shared a common philosophy, of the application of the best available science, to be applied to the problem at hand, then ongoing monitoring to ensure that the results were beneficial. Sutherland acted sometimes as Nightingale’s research assistant, finding crucial material for her—he was a doctor and well connected internationally with public health and military experts. Sometimes he was her secretary, reading correspondence and drafting replies for her. They shared a Christian faith and ambitious, faith-based, goals for reform. Sutherland drafted some of Nightingale’s boldest statements about quality hospital care being available to the poorest—as good as that received by private patients.

Sutherland continued his beneficent work to within a few years of his death, which took place at Oakleigh, Alleyne Park, Norwood, Surrey, on 14 July 1891. Sutherland’s last words to his wife were for Nightingale: “Give her my love and my blessing”. Nightingale insisted that a full obituary to her friend and collaborator appeared in The Times. Sutherland was buried at West Norwood Cemetery.

Eight volumes of notes and correspondence between Sutherland and Nightingale are at the British Library.

== Publications ==
- ‘General Board of Health Report on the Sanitary Condition of the Epidemic Districts in London, with special reference to the threatened Visitation of Cholera,’ 1852; and a reply to Sir John Hall's 'Observations on the Report of the Sanitary Commission despatched to the Seat of the War in the East,' 1857, to which Hall made a rejoinder in 1858. Sutherland edited the 'Journal of Public Health and Monthly Record of Sanitary Improvement,' 1847–8.
- Report to the Right Hon Lord Panmure, G.C.B. &c, Minister at War, of the Proceedings of the Sanitary Commission Dispatched to the Seat of War in the East 1855–56. London Harrison & Sons 1857. ONLINE as Parl Paper
- Report on the Site, Etc., of the Royal Victoria Hospital, near Netley Abbey. London: Harrison & Sons 1858.
