= John Hall (Archdeacon of Killaloe) =

17th century Irish priest

The Ven. John Hall (1626–1691) was a Church of Ireland priest in the 17th century and early 18th century.

An Englishman, Hall was educated at Trinity College, Dublin. He was ordained on 31 March 1667. In 1667 he became Archdeacon of Killaloe and in 1668 Precentor of Leighlin.
