= Johnny Hall (Australian footballer) =

Australian rules footballer

Personal information
- Full name: Johnny Hall
- Born: 14 May 1917
- Died: 24 September 2009 (aged 92)
- Height: 178 cm (5 ft 10 in)
- Weight: 77 kg (170 lb)

Playing career^{1}
Years	Club	Games (Goals)
1938	Hawthorn	2 (7)
- ^{1} Playing statistics correct to the end of 1938.

Johnny Hall (14 May 1917 – 24 September 2009) was an Australian rules footballer who played with Hawthorn in the Victorian Football League (VFL).
