= Jack Hall (footballer, born 1905) =

English footballer

John Hall (born January 1905) was an English footballer who played as an outside right in The Football League in the 1920s. He played one League game for Lincoln City in 1923–24 before moving to Accrington Stanley, where he made five appearances and scored one goal. In May 1925, he was transferred to Manchester United, making his debut for them on 6 February 1926 against Burnley. He made three appearances for United in his time at the club.

He also played three matches for Mossley in the 1939–40 season.
