= John Herbert Hall =

English First World War flying ace

- Born: 2 July 1899; Starbeck, North Yorkshire
- Died: 1978 (aged 78–79); Leeds, West Yorkshire
- Military career
- Allegiance: United Kingdom
- Branch: British Army; Royal Air Force
- Rank: Sergeant
- Service number: 93513
- Unit: No. 22 Squadron RAF
- Awards: Décoration Militaire (Belgium)

Sergeant John Herbert Hall (2 July 1899 – 1978) was an English First World War flying ace, credited with five aerial victories.

He served in No. 22 Squadron RAF, flying as an observer/gunner in the Bristol F.2b. His first two victories came on 5 June 1918, shooting down an Albatros D.V in the morning and a Pfalz D.III in the evening, with pilot Lieutenant John Everard Gurdon. On 9 July, flying with Lieutenant T. W. Martin, he accounted for two Albatros D.Vs, and then a Fokker D.VII on 27 August. Hall was awarded the Décoration Militaire by Belgium in February 1919.
