= Greenwood & Hall =

American educational technology company

Greenwood Hall
- Type: Public
- Industry: Education Management, Educational Technology
- Founded: 1997; Irvine, California
- Defunct: December 15, 2017
- Headquarters: Irvine, California (1998-2002); Santa Ana, California (2002-2015); Los Angeles, California (2015-2017)
- Key people: Bill Bradfield, CEO; Timothy Boris, COO & General Counsel; Dr. John R. Hall, (Founder & Former CEO); Zan Greenwood, (Founder & Former COO)
- Website: Archived official website at the Wayback Machine (archived 2017-07-06)

Greenwood Hall was a publicly traded educational technology company that provided cloud-based people and technology-enabled solutions designed to help post-secondary institutions better manage the student lifecycle. Greenwood Hall was headquartered in Los Angeles, California and operated student service center facilities in Orange County, California, Myrtle Beach, South Carolina, Phoenix, Arizona, and College Station, Texas. The Company ceased operations on December 15, 2017, after its assets were sold to Answernet. The former Company's assets now operate as Answernet Education Services, in Phoenix, Arizona, from the same facility operated by Greenwood Hall, prior to it ceasing operations.

== History ==
Greenwood Hall was founded by Dr. John R. Hall and Zan Greenwood in 1997. In 1998, Greenwood Hall commenced call center operations from a facility in Irvine, California and a partner location in nearby Santa Ana, California. The Company focused on building its call center network during the first years of operations to support the needs of the direct response television industry and large television infomercials.

In 2000, the Company expanded its operations to include customer relationship management, logistics, fulfillment, and other related services as demand for the outsourcing of these services continued to increase significantly.

The Company relocated its corporate headquarters in August 2002 from Irvine to Santa Ana, California.

In the fall of 2006, the Company announced an expansion of its services and infrastructure and to accommodate significant new demand within higher education. In October 2007, Greenwood & Hall acquired the Financial Aid Solutions (FAS) Division of Nelnet, Inc.

As of 2010, Greenwood Hall shifted its focus to helping colleges and universities manage the student lifecycle.

In 2013, Greenwood Hall commenced a restructuring, during which time the Company shed unprofitable business and made changes to its management team.

In August 2014, the Company announced it completed an $8 million recapitalization which included refinancing of its bank debt and an equity infusion for expansion purposes. In conjunction with the recapitalization, the Company became a publicly traded entity.

In May 2015, the Company opened a new student services center in Phoenix, Arizona, relocating its California operations to this facility. The Company located its corporate headquarters and sales offices to West Los Angeles, California in conjunction with this move.

In July 2017, John R. Hall, Greenwood Hall's Co-Founder and Chief Executive Officer, abruptly resigned from the Company after 19 years as CEO. In his resignation letter, Hall expressed concerns regarding his ability to operate the Company based on constraints Hall stated were being imposed on Greenwood Hall by its lender. In his letter, Hall also indicated he was owed back pay as well as approximately $250,000 in funds he incurred on Greenwood Hall's behalf.

In August 2017, Bill Bradfield, Greenwood Hall's EVP of Business Development and the former Founder & CEO of Perceptis, Inc. was appointed the Company's Chief Executive Officer.

In October 2017, it was announced that Greenwood Hall was moving its operations and corporate headquarters to South Carolina, where it planned to invest over $1.4 million and hire more than 300 employees.

In December 2017, Greenwood Hall abruptly closed its Bryan, TX and Myrtle Beach, SC locations and it was reported that the assets of Greenwood Hall were sold to Answernet and that Answernet would continue to operate the Company's Phoenix, AZ location rebranded Answernet Education Services.

=== Higher Education ===
Greenwood Hall provided cloud-based services for higher education institutions that support the student lifecycle.
