= John Halle =

English surgeon, medical writer and poet

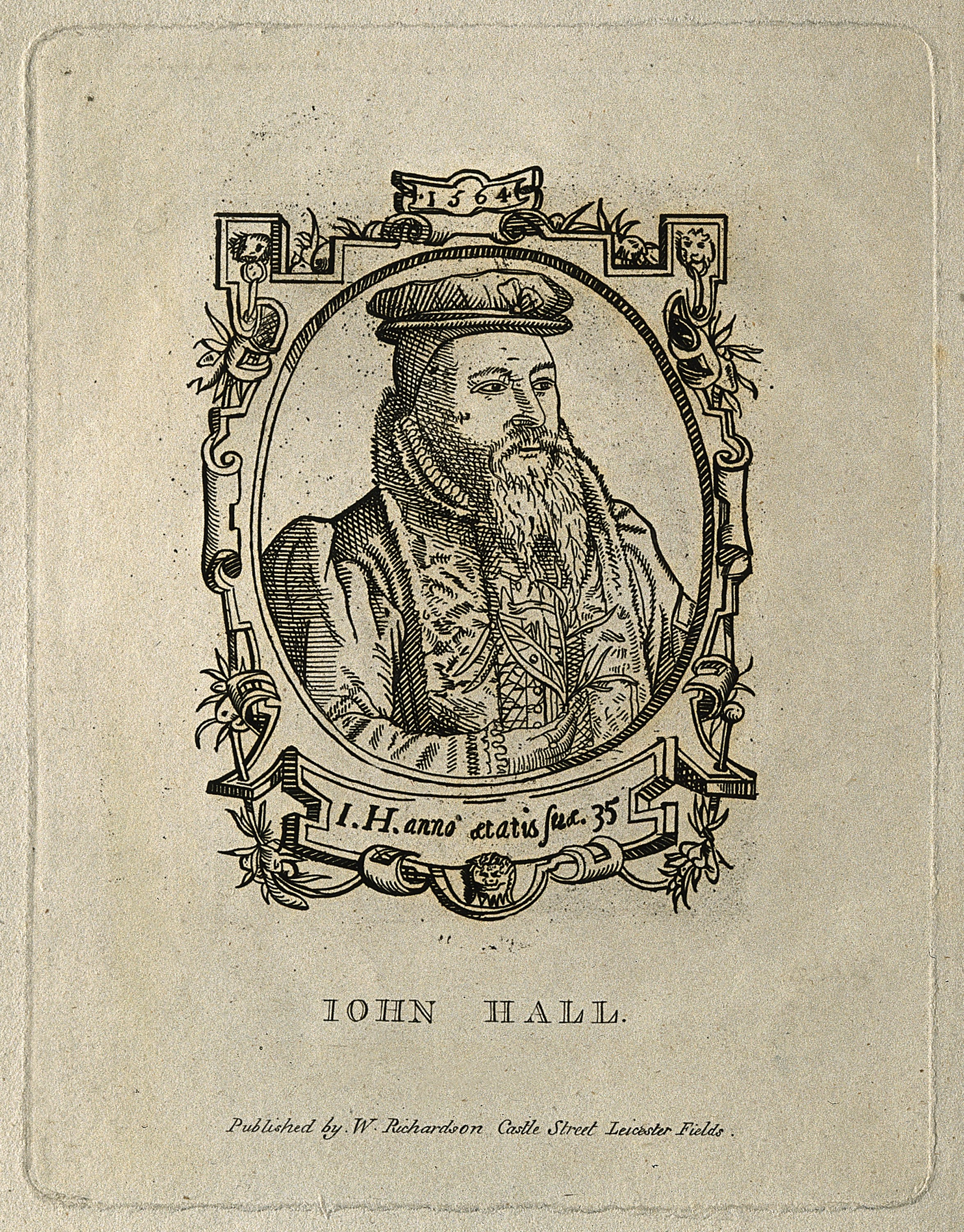
1565 woodcut

John Halle, or John Hall of Goochenberry (c. 1529/1530 – c. 1568) was an English surgeon, known as a medical writer and poet.

== Life ==
Born in 1529, probably in Willesborough Kent to a farming family who rented from the Wyatt family of Allington Castle, Maidstone.

He was highly educated, possibly at Kings School Canterbury. In 1548/9 he was apprenticed to John Banckes, a senior officer of the London Company of Barber-Surgeons. John, already a radical Protestant, started to write, mainly poetical versions of Bible texts especially the psalms, utilizing a variety of rhyming patterns First published in 1549, his verse reappeared in multiple editions, rivaling in popularity then the better-known psalm translations of Sternhold and Hopkins.

In 1553/4 he left London to volunteer with the army of Sir Thomas Wyatt the Younger, who was attempting to overthrow the newly-crowned Queen Mary Tudor, Catholic daughter of Henry VIII. The rebellion failed, and John was captured and convicted of treason. However his execution was stayed, and he was permitted to complete his apprenticeship in 1555 and retire to Maidstone, where he lived before his death in 1568.

His first apprentice was his step-brother Thomas, who later became M.B., M.D. at Oxford University and the first recorded doubly-qualified physician-surgeon. John's surviving letter-book shows he was unusually collegial with local physicians, who shared the care of patients with him.

John's next important literary work was his poetical miscellany, The Court of Vertue, which introduced moralizing parodies of poems of Sir Thomas Wyatt the Elder among others. His most important contribution was in bringing to English readers important new medical and anatomical findings from Continental scholars such as Vesalius, Paracelsus and Paré, in a greatly extended version of Lanfranke's Chirugia Parva.

The first part is a treatise on wounds in the form of a scientific review, in which Halle introduces new findings from other authors. It is followed by the largest medical dictionary then in print, his Expositive Table, which included hundreds of descriptions of chemical and herbal medicines and of symptoms and diseases.

It is notable for the citation of many modern authors. He describes the continuous expansion of medical knowledge by new research, and condemns the static classical definitions of the Galenic tradition.

There follows an anatomy, the first introduction of Vesalius' findings, expanded by observations of his own and other English anatomists. These include evidence for the recirculation of the blood, on the thickness of blood vessel walls and its role in driving the diffusion of gases.

Other topics are an original explanation of the role of the epiglottis in preventing choking, and the function of the placenta vessels are different stages of development.

Then there is a section on medical ethics, stressing the right of patients to their diagnosis, the right to a second opinion, and the primacy of experience over book learning. The book ends with an important account of the uncredentialled medical empirics and their frauds as seen from Maidstone between 1555 and 1565.

Hall's extraordinary medical book has never been reprinted. Soon after its publication Halle died. More traditional medical men may have discouraged the propagation of its ideas. Later many of these ideas appeared unacknowledged in seventeenth-century tests.

- Certayne Chapters taken out of the Proverbes of Solomon, with other Chapters of the Holy Scripture, and certayne Psalmes of David, translated into English Metre, London (Thomas Raynalde), 1549.
- A Poesie in Forme of a Vision, briefly inveying against the most hatefull and prodigious artes of Necromancie, Witchcraft, Sorcerie, Incantations, and divers other detestable and deuilishe practises, dayly used under colour of Judiciall Astrologie, London, 1563.
- The Court of Vertue, contayning many Holy or Spretuall Songes, Sonnettes, Psalmes, Balletts, and Shorte Sentences, as well of Holy Scripture, as others, with musical notes, London, 1565. This book seems by the prologue to have been written to contrast with The Court of Venus, a collection of love songs.
- A most excellent and learned woorke of chirurgerie, called Chirurgia parva Lanfranci, Lanfranke of Mylayne his briefe: reduced from dyvers translations to our vulgar-frase, and now first published in the Englyshe prynte, black letter, 4 pts., London, 1565. Translation from Lanfranc of Milan. It contains a woodcut portrait of the translator, "æt. 35, 1564". Appended were two other works: A very frutefull and necessary briefe worke of Anatomie; and An Historiall Expostulation: Against the beastlye Abusers, both of Chyrurgerie, and Physyke, in oure tyme: with a goodlye Doctrine and Instruction, necessarye to be marked and folowed, of all true Chirurgiens, reprinted in volume 11 of the publications of the Percy Society, London, 1844, edited by Thomas Joseph Pettigrew. Halle denounced in the latter the quacks of the day, and opposed the combination of magic, divination, and physic.
- A metrical version of The Prouerbes of Salamon, thre chapters of Ecclesiastes, the sixthe chapter of Sapientia, the ix chapter of Ecclesiasticus, and certayne psalmes of Dauid, London (Edward Whitchurch), n.d., dedicated to John Bricket, Esq., of Eltham. Halle complained that chapters of the Book of Proverbs, translated by him into English metre, 1550, had been attributed to Thomas Sternhold.
- English translation of Benedict Victorius Faventinus's and Niccolò Massa's treatises De Morbo Gallico; Cure of the French Disease, a manuscript in the Bodleian Library, which also contains letters from Halle to William Cuningham.
- Commendatory verses, in English, prefixed to Thomas Gale's Enchiridion of Chirurgerie, 1563, and to the same author's Institution of a Chirurgian, 1563.
