= Jack Hall (architect) =

American architect and designer

John Hughes Hall (1913–2003) was an American architect and industrial designer working in the Modernist style. Hall is best known for his residential works on Massachusetts' Cape Cod which were designed to nestle within, rather than overtake, the natural landscape.

== Life and career ==
Hughes was born on Long Island. He graduated from Princeton University in 1935. Following graduation he worked as a freelance news reporter in Europe. Hall began visiting Cape Cod, Massachusetts in 1936, and immediately became fascinated by the landscape – enough to purchase an 180-acre (0.73 km^{2}) farm compound on Bound Brook Island (no longer an island) in Wellfleet from Katie Dos Passos, wife of the writer John Dos Passos. Following the U.S. entry in World War II Hall enlisted in the United States Army and was discharged honorably in 1946. Hall had 3 children, all from his marriage to Dodie Merwin, two daughters Leonora 'Noa' Hall and Katrina and a son, Darius Hall.

Hall and friends, Jack Phillips and Hayden Walling were three self-taught, designer-builders in Wellfleet who created a welcoming environment for European Modernists arriving in the mid-1940s. In 1946, Hall began a design-build practice in Wellfleet which he continued intermittently until he retired. Projects included the Peter's Hill Restaurant building, the Hatch Cottage, and many studios, renovations, and additions.

In 1956, Hall began working for a succession of New York City architectural firms including Nardin and Radoczy, Tom Lee Ltd., Hughes & Hood, and George Nelson and Company. His study of industrial design led to work on a number of major traveling exhibitions for the United States Information Agency including the exhibition "Graphics USA" in 1963 with Ivan Chermayeff (son of Serge Chermayeff). While with Hughes and Hood he designed many showrooms in the United States and Europe for the Fieldcrest Mills.

In 1959, he spent four months in Moscow helping to assemble an installation titled The Jungle Gym, George Nelson's contribution to the American National Exhibition. Hall worked with Charles and Ray Eames on a light fixture in 1964 and designed a café table for the Museum of Modern Art's restaurant. In 1957 Hall opened an office in New York City, and began simultaneously teaching at the Parsons School of Design's industrial design department. During this period he worked on residential projects completing the design of many townhouse renovations including one for Serge Chermayeff and his wife Barbara Chermayeff.

Hall was also a self-taught painter working in the 'American Primitivist' style and famously enrolled in clowning school in his later years.

== Residential projects on Cape Cod ==
- Hall House No. 1, Wellfleet, Massachusetts, circa 1952 (with Warren Nardin)
- Peter's Hill Restaurant, Truro, Massachusetts, 1953
- Baker-Hall House Renovation, Wellfleet, Massachusetts, 1955–56
- Hatch Cottage, Wellfleet, Massachusetts, 1960
- Anton Myrer House, Wellfleet, Massachusetts, 1962
- Watts Studio, Wellfleet, Massachusetts, 1972
- Judith Rothschild Studio, Wellfleet, Massachusetts, 1972
- Levin House Renovation, Wellfleet, Massachusetts, 1972
- Frederiksen Guest House, Wellfleet, Massachusetts, 1972

== See also ==
- Cape Cod Modern House Trust
