= Electoral fraud in the United States =

In the United States, electoral fraud, or voter fraud, involves illegal voting in or manipulation of United States elections. Types of fraud include voter impersonation or in-person voter fraud, mail-in or absentee ballot fraud, illegal voting by noncitizens, and double voting. The United States government defines voter or ballot fraud as one of three broad categories of federal election crimes, the other two being campaign finance crimes and civil rights violations.

Electoral fraud is very rare in the United States. Mail-in voter fraud occurs more often than in-person voter fraud. In the last half-century, there have been only scattered examples of electoral fraud affecting the outcomes of United States elections, mostly on the local level. Electoral fraud was significantly more prevalent in earlier United States history, particularly in the 19th and early 20th centuries, and has long been a significant topic in American politics. False accusations of electoral fraud also have a long history, and since the 2016 and 2020 elections have often been associated with Donald Trump and the election denial movement in the United States.

== Frequency ==
Research has consistently found that voter fraud in the United States is very rare. (Note: Very rare An anomaly Vanishingly rare Exceedingly rare Exceptionally rare Unlikely, bigger concern voter intimidation almost no evidence of systemic fraud, even by mail doesn't exist) Fraud is more likely to occur in and affect the outcome of local elections, where the potential impact of a small number of votes can be greater. Some experts have said voter fraud can be difficult to prove or find, depending on the circumstances, although experts generally consider widespread cheating easy to detect.

The term fraud is often used to describe all illegal voting cases even where there was no intent. Cases of illegal voting are often accidental.

=== Nationwide databases ===
In 2012, News21, an Arizona State University journalism project, published a database of 2,068 alleged voter fraud cases reported between 2000 and 2012. This represented about 0.000003 cases for every vote cast. 46 percent of cases also resulted in acquittals, dropped charges or decisions not to bring charges. News21 gathered the information by sending public records requests to elections officials and prosecutors and reviewing court records and media reports and created the most comprehensive database to date of electoral fraud despite not being able to obtain data from all jurisdictions. The database also includes instances of voter intimidation.

The Heritage Foundation, a conservative think tank, publishes an incomplete database of voter fraud cases brought by prosecutors since 1979. As of November 2023, there were 1,465 proven cases of voter fraud listed in 44 years, an average of 33 cases per year. This represents a tiny fraction of total votes. In Texas, for example, Heritage found 103 cases of confirmed voter fraud between 2005 and 2022, in a period where 107 million ballots were cast, or 0.000096% of all ballots cast. Heritage has stated that the database is only a "sampling" and not comprehensive.

=== Voter impersonation ===
Voter impersonation, or in-person voter fraud, occurs when someone votes in-person under the identity of someone else. It is extremely rare. (Note: Virtually non-existent Very rare Extremely rare Vanishingly rare) Between 1978 and 2018, no elections were overturned by courts due to voter impersonation fraud. Cases of voter impersonation are often difficult to prove. Rutgers professor Lorraine Minnite has maintained that voter impersonation is illogical from the perspective of the perpetrator due to the high risk and limited upside of casting one vote. If caught, perpetrators of voter impersonation can face up to 5 years in prison and a fine of up to $10,000 for citizens and deportation for immigrants. Proponents of voter identification laws have argued that it can be difficult to detect voter impersonation if voter ID is not required. University of Virginia law professor Michael D. Gilbert agreed with Minnite in 2014 that theory and evidence suggest voter impersonation "rarely occurs", though agreed with voter ID proponents that "the failure to observe fraud does not mean that no fraud takes place". Gilbert noted that it is difficult for someone to coordinate widespread voter impersonation to steal an election, as even if they paid people to vote in-person for their preferred candidate, the secret ballot ensures they could not confirm whether these people voted the way they were paid to.

ABC News reported in 2012 that only four cases of voter impersonation had led to convictions in Texas over the previous decade. News21 identified a total of 10 cases of alleged voter impersonation in the United States between 2000 and 2012. Another 2012 study found no evidence that voter impersonation (in the form of people voting under the auspices of a dead voter) occurred in the 2006 Georgia general elections. In a 2013 study, the New York City Department of Investigation (DOI) sent investigators to vote under the names of 63 ineligible voters, who were either deceased, felons or had moved outside New York City. 61 of those investigators were allowed to illegally vote under their assumed identities. One of the two who was not allowed to vote was recognized by the mother of the felon they were impersonating, who worked at the polling place. In five instances, investigators in their 20s or 30s successfully posed as voters age 82 to 94. The DOI report stated that this result, while not large enough to be statistically significant, "indicates vulnerability in the system".

In April 2014, Federal District Court Judge Lynn Adelman ruled in Frank v. Walker that Wisconsin's voter ID law was unconstitutional because "virtually no voter impersonation occurs in Wisconsin". A 2014 Election Law Journal study of the 2012 election found no evidence of widespread voter impersonation. In August 2014, Loyola Law School professor Justin Levitt reported in The Washington Post 's Wonkblog that he had identified only 31 credible cases of voter impersonation since 2000. The most serious incident identified involved as many as 24 people trying to vote under assumed names in Brooklyn, which would still not have made a significant difference in most American elections. News21 reviewed cases of possible voter impersonation between 2012 and 2016 in five states where politicians had expressed concerns about it, and out of 38 successful state prosecutions for voter fraud, none were for voter impersonation.

=== Mail-in ballot fraud ===
Multiple forms of voter fraud have been documented using mail-in or absentee ballots, which include the requesting and submitting of absentee ballots on behalf of other voters; ballot stuffing in absentee drop boxes; coercion of voters, since the ballot is not always cast in secret; ballots being stolen from the mail and submitted; and collection of ballots by dishonest collectors who mark votes or fail to deliver ballots. Ballot harvesting, or third parties collecting and delivering absentee ballots for voters, is also illegal or restricted in some states. While quite rare, experts say fraud occurs more often with mailed-in votes than with in-person voting. (Note: Isolated cases, very rare More common than in-person, # cases relatively small 'Very, very rare' + more frequent than in-person While slightly more common than in-person, it's a minuscule amount Rare + seems to occur more often than in-person Exceedingly rare Extremely rare, seems to occur more often than in-person Extremely rare 58% of Texas prosecutions but still minuscule Minuscule Widespread voter fraud described as a 'fantasy' Experts say more common, but still rare) Between 1978 and 2018, at least fourteen elections were invalidated or overturned by courts due to absentee ballot fraud, twelve of which were at the local level (for such offices as county clerk, sheriff, judge, and mayor).

Postal ballots have been the source of "most significant vote-counting disputes in recent decades" according to Edward Foley, director of the Election Law program at Ohio State University. In 2012, The New York Times wrote that according to election administrators, fraud in voting by mail was "far less common than innocent errors" but "vastly more prevalent" than in-person voting fraud. University of Chicago political scientist Anthony Fowler said in 2020 that fraudulently voting on behalf of someone else, tampering with ballots, coercion or vote buying could all be easier with mail-in ballots, but that in practice "the risk of widespread fraud is probably very minimal, even with all-mail elections". Loyola Marymount professor Justin Levitt stated in 2020 that misconduct in mail voting is "meaningfully more prevalent" than with voting in person, but that misconduct "still amounts to only a tiny fraction" of mail ballots. Lonna Atkeson, an expert in election administration, said about mail-in voting fraud, "It's really hard to find ... The fact is, we really don't know how much fraud there is ... There aren't millions of fraudulent votes, but there are some." Lorraine Minnite said "my sense is that it is not much more frequent than in-person voter fraud, which rarely occurs." Richard Hasen, a professor at University of California, Irvine School of Law, said that "problems are extremely rare in the five states that rely primarily on vote-by-mail."

An analysis by News21 found 491 known cases of absentee ballot fraud between 2000 and 2012. In April 2020, a voter fraud study covering 20 years by the Massachusetts Institute of Technology found the level of mail-in ballot fraud "exceedingly rare" since it occurs only in "0.00006 percent" of individual votes nationally, and, in one state, "0.000004 percent – about five times less likely than getting hit by lightning in the United States." A 2020 Washington Post analysis of data from three vote-by-mail states (Colorado, Oregon and Washington), with help from the Electronic Registration Information Center (ERIC), found that out of about 14.6 million mail votes cast in 2016 and 2018 officials had flagged just 372 possible cases of double voting or voting on behalf of deceased people. In many cases, ballot drop boxes are placed in locations where they can be monitored by security cameras or election staff.

=== Noncitizen voting ===
Illegal voting by noncitizens occurs when noncitizens vote in elections they are not eligible to, such as federal elections. It is extremely rare. (Note: infinitesimal Extremely rare Exceedingly rare Exceptionally rare So rare as to be insignificant Almost never happens Nonexistent problem Rare Microscopic numbers Statistically rare Very rare) This is due in part to the more severe penalties associated with the practice including deportation, up to five years of incarceration or fines, as well as the jeopardizing of naturalization efforts. The federal form to register a voter requires a unique identification number such as a Social Security or driver's license number. New voters must check a box attesting that they are a citizen, and are not required to provide documentary proof of citizenship when registering. States typically have safeguards to prevent noncitizen voting, although the extent to which states verify citizenship of voters differs. When noncitizens are added to voter rolls, it is usually by mistake, as the result of a federal law that requires states to offer people voter registration when they visit a motor vehicle office. Sometimes it also appears that more noncitizens are on voter rolls than there are because they became naturalized citizens but have not yet been back to the DMV to update their citizenship status in the DMV database.

Studies of voter rolls have typically found very few noncitizen voters. As of July 2024, the Heritage Foundation database includes only 24 noncitizen voting cases from between 2003 and 2023. In an audit of the 2016 elections, the North Carolina State Board of Elections found that 41 out of 4.8 million total votes were by noncitizens, and between 2017 and 2024, only three cases were referred for prosecution. In 2018, CNN reported that in the past three years, Kansas Secretary of State Kris Kobach had convicted three noncitizens of voting out of 1.8 million voters. A Brennan Center for Justice study of 2016 data from 42 jurisdictions found an estimated 30 incidents of suspected noncitizen voting out of 23.5 million votes cast (or .0001% of votes). A review in Georgia found that no potential noncitizens had been allowed to register to vote between 1997 and 2022. In September 2024, an audit in Oregon found that more than 1,200 possible noncitizens had been added to the state's voter rolls by mistake; the issue was quickly fixed and no more than 5 noncitizens had cast ballots. In July 2026, an audit in New Jersey found around 6,600 noncitizens had wrongly been registered to vote in 2023 and 2024 due to a software error, and that almost 400 had illegally voted. Meanwhile, in Nevada, Homeland Security Secretary Markwayne Mullin claimed 15,903 noncitizens were registered to vote in Nevada, before revising that claim down to 185. After a review of those 185 registered voters, Nevada found all 185 to be citizens.

Some prominent Republicans such as House Speaker Mike Johnson have argued that widespread noncitizen voting is a threat, though such claims have been largely unsupported by evidence. Johnson stated in May 2024 that "We all know intuitively that a lot of illegals are voting in federal elections, but it's not been something that is easily provable." Several Republican-led states have flagged and removed purported noncitizens from voter rolls ranging in the hundreds or thousands. These figures have been criticized by voting rights organizations as partisan efforts based on incorrect (often outdated) data that erroneously includes many legal voters, particularly naturalized citizens. Before the 2014 midterm elections in Florida, then-governor Rick Scott announced a purge of 180,000 suspected foreign nationals from voter rolls, though only 85 names were removed and only one person was prosecuted. A 2014 estimate of noncitizen voting by Jesse Richman was widely discredited by political scientists. Noncitizens who can vote in the few local elections where it is legal rarely cast ballots.

Legal scholar Richard Hasen characterized noncitizen voting as a small problem in the early 2010s, but said in 2020 that claims of noncitizen voting "evaporated in the sunlight of public inspection and legal examination." He also said "spurious claims more likely serve as a pretext for passing laws aimed at making it harder for people likely to vote for Democrats to register and vote." San Francisco State University professor and noncitizen voting expert Ron Hayduk referred to noncitizen voting as a "problem that doesn't exist". Glenn Kessler in The Washington Post stated there was "scattered evidence" of noncitizen voting and little to support the idea that it ever affected the outcome of a major election, but that the scarcity of evidence "does not necessarily prove that the phenomenon does not happen", as "there is no obvious victim to make a complaint and little public documentation to prove that a voter is not a citizen". In 2020 and 2024, the libertarian Cato Institute said that there was no detectable amount of noncitizen voting.

=== Double voting ===
Double voting is when someone illegally votes twice, either in the same state or in different states during the same election cycle. It is considered extremely rare. (Note: Extremely rare Exceptionally rare) When someone votes twice within the same state, it is often inadvertent, for example if a voter thinks their absentee ballot will not be delivered in time. As of 2023, the only system that can detect double voting across states is the Electronic Registration Information Center (ERIC), which close to half of states participate in. A 2008 Election Law Journal article found that a number of claims from the early 2000s purporting to have found double voters were due largely to the 'Birthday problem', or the statistical probability of people sharing the same name and birthday across multiple states. It noted that substantiated instances of double voting are 'notable mostly for their rarity.' In 2007, the Secretary of State of Washington checked voter signatures to verify whether or not double-voting occurred among people with the same name and birthday, and the check exonerated all but one person.

An American Political Science Review study of voter data from the 2012 United States presidential election estimated that at most 1 in 4,000 voters illegally cast two ballots, though it noted accounting errors could account for most if not all of those numbers. The study found that many apparent double-voters were the result of incorrectly marking someone as having voted. It also concluded that when two voter records share the same name and birthdate, removing the earlier registration could impede approximately 300 legitimate votes for each double vote prevented. Being registered to vote in multiple states without voting in more than one is allowed. The legal definition of double voting varies between states, but voting more than once in a given election is illegal under the Voting Rights Act and comes with a fine of up to $10,000 and up to five years in prison.

=== Felony voting ===
In the United States, depending on the state, a person may have their voting rights suspended or withdrawn due to the conviction of a criminal offense, usually a felony. Felons who cast a ballot in those states often do not know that they were ineligible to vote. A North Carolina State Board of Elections audit of the 2016 elections found that 441 felons had voted before their right to vote had been restored. Out of 12 people on probation for a felony who were charged with illegal voting in Alamance County, North Carolina in 2016, five stated in separate interviews with The New York Times that they had thought they were allowed to vote. At least seven pled down to misdemeanors. The Guardian reported in 2024 that prosecuting voters who were ineligible due to a felony was the main type of prosecution pursued in Florida. In 2022, Florida governor Ron DeSantis arrested more than 20 people who were ineligible to vote related to a felony conviction, nearly all of whom were confused about their eligibility after having received voter registration cards from the state.

=== Voter registration fraud ===
Voter registration fraud involves the purposeful registration of ineligible people to vote. Between 2000 and 2012, News21 found 393 cases of alleged voter registration fraud across 34 states, many of which were linked to third-party voter registration groups such as ACORN. The registering of fake names, often motivated by quotas for third-party canvassers, has also been sometimes observed.

==== Outdated voter registration ====
Outdated voter registration rolls occur when individuals who die, move away from a location or otherwise become ineligible to vote remain on voter rolls for a period afterwards. The phenomenon has not been linked to voter fraud despite allegations connecting the two. A 2012 report by the Pew Center on the States based on data collected in 2008, found that over 1.8 million dead people were registered to vote nationwide and over 3 million voters were registered in multiple states. According to PolitiFact, the study investigated "outdated voter rolls, not fraudulent votes". In an October 2016 Associated Press fact-check, the author noted these voter registration irregularities left some people concerned that the electoral system was vulnerable to the impersonation of dead voters; however, voter rolls with dead voters are usually due to the states being slow to eliminate dead voters. By 2016, most states had addressed concerns raised by the Pew 2012 report.

As of October 2024, Michigan had one of the most bloated voter rolls in the nation, with 500,000 more registered voters than citizens of voting age. This has not been connected to fraud, and is caused in part by federal laws restricting the removal of inactive voters. In 2020, the Arizona Attorney General investigated 282 claims of dead people voting and found one which was substantiated. The same year, Republican legislators in Michigan found two dead voters in Wayne County out of a list of 200 supposed cases. In a notable case in 2025, a Los Angeles County man received a mail-in ballot for a woman who had died 31 years ago, though there was no evidence anyone had voted on her behalf.

=== Vote buying ===
Vote buying is illegal in the United States at the federal level if money is promised to certain individuals to vote or register to vote, though at the state level, most states only criminalize paying people to vote. Promising cash payments to a large number of voters is legal. Courts have also historically considered providing free transport to voters legally permissible. While illegal vote buying has occurred relatively more often in certain areas such as Appalachia, experts say it is rarely an issue in national-level races. Vote buying schemes affected at least six local elections between 2009 and 2012, four of which were in Appalachia. Elon Musk was accused by some election experts of vote buying in the 2024 United States presidential election, who ran a lottery to give away $1 million daily to a registered voter who signs a petition he created, and offered $47 for referring a registered voter to the petition. The legality of a Cards Against Humanity program that would pay up to $100 to 2020 nonvoters who make a plan to vote in 2024 was similarly debated. A 2020 study in Acta Politica found that around 25% of Americans would be willing to sell their vote for a minimum payment of $418. Democrats and liberal voters were more likely to sell, and the likelihood was not impacted by education or income levels.

=== Other types ===
A type of fraud that sometimes occurs is falsification of signatures on nominating petitions or ballot initiatives. Experts say that as the cost of gathering paid signatures goes up, there is a greater incentive for this type of fraud. There is a variety of other types of election fraud, with varying prevalence, including:

- Election workers changing or destroying ballots after they arrive.
- Election workers marking ballots as void, so they appear as 'undercounts'.
- Ballot stuffing, where the perpetrator will insert ballots pre-filled to a given candidate.
- Helping people to fill out provisional ballots, then discarding those ballots.

== Notable cases ==
According to University of Kentucky professor Tracy Campbell, author of the 2005 book Deliver the Vote: A History of Election Fraud, an American Political Tradition – 1742-2004, electoral fraud has historically been "deeply embedded" in American political culture. In the 1996 book Dirty Little Secrets: The Persistence of Corruption in American Politics, Larry Sabato and Glenn R. Simpson observed that Democrats "feature prominently in almost all of the instances" of fraud in the 19th and 20th century, although Republicans were also fully capable of fraud "when circumstances permit". Sabato and Simpson posited that Democrats have had more opportunities to commit fraud due to more often having control of both local and legislative offices and a greater percentage of their voter base appearing "to be available or more vulnerable to participation".

Between 1798 and 1901, 217 United States House of Representatives elections were contested with claims of fraud, with the House voting to overturn or vacate the election 94 times. Between 1908 and 1951, 15 House elections were overturned or vacated. Since 1913, four United States Senate races were overturned by the Senate after the losing candidate challenged the outcome.

=== 19th century ===
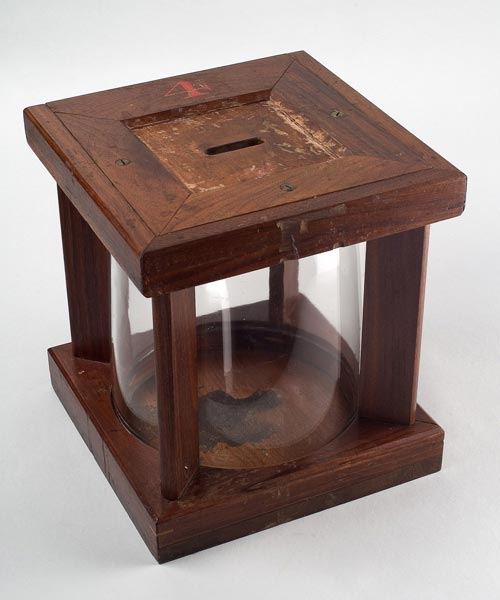
A glass ballot box was patented in 1858 to prevent electoral fraud.

Electoral fraud was prevalent in the United States during the 19th century, when safeguards against fraud and electioneering were considerably weaker, and political machines wielded significantly more power. Political parties would produce their own ballots, and as of the mid-19th century, seven states still conducted elections by voice voting. States only began to adopt the secret ballot in the 1880s and 1890s. Voter fraud was so common that it developed its own vocabulary. "Colonizers" were groups of bought voters who moved en masse between wards. "Floaters" cast ballots for multiple parties, and "repeaters" voted multiple times, sometimes in disguise. Cooping was a form of fraud where people were kidnapped, drugged and forced to repeatedly vote, and is thought to have contributed to the 1849 death of Edgar Allan Poe.

Cheating occurred in all parts of the country. Cities such as New York City, Chicago, San Francisco, and Pittsburgh had elections influenced by political machines. The Tammany Hall machine in New York City, for example, encouraged residents to vote multiple times by shaving their beards, registered voters under fake names, physically intimidated voters and granted citizenship to newly arrived immigrants. Cheating also regularly occurred in suburban and rural areas. Voter fraud and suppression against African Americans was common in the Jim Crow South.

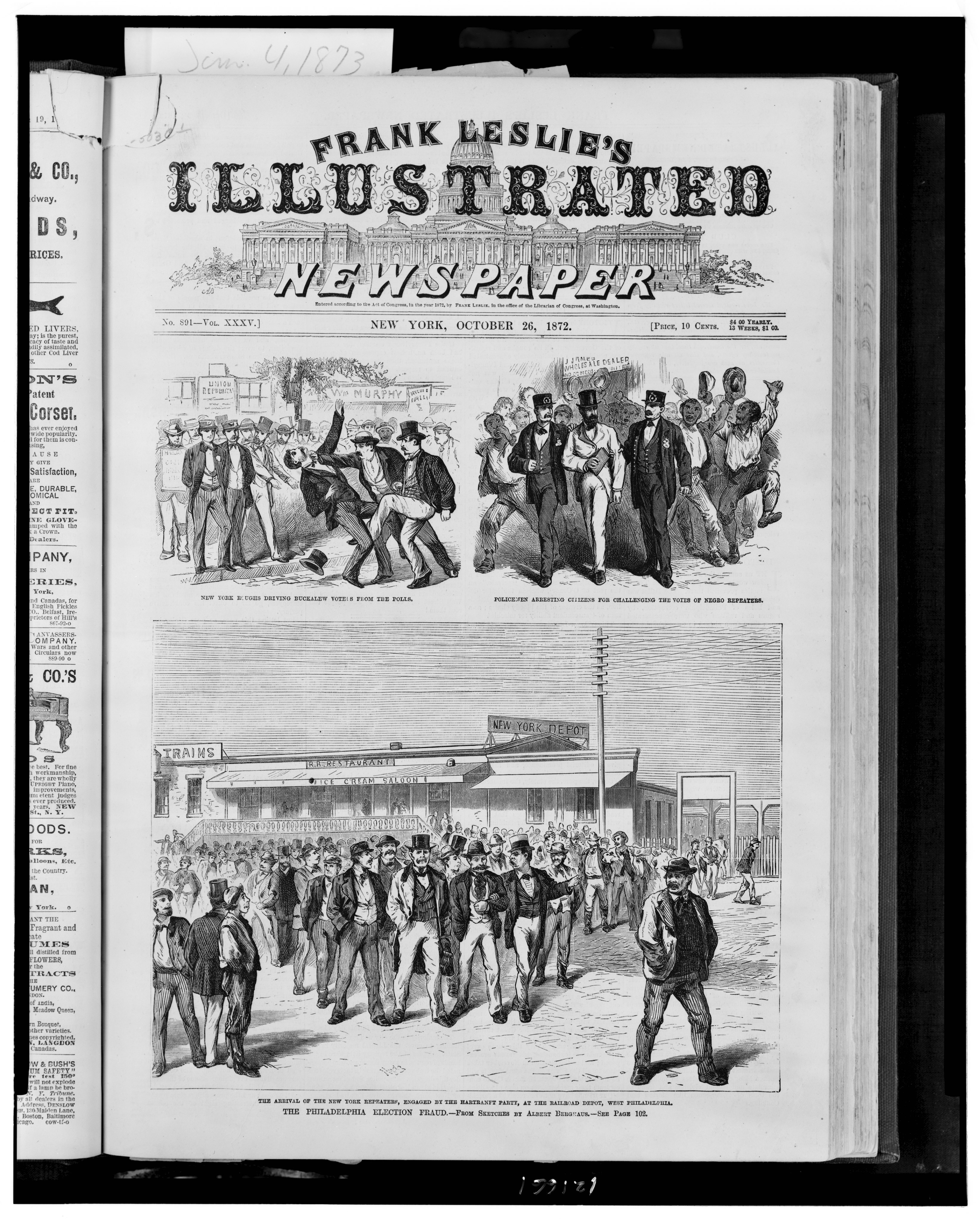
1872 depiction of electoral fraud in Philadelphia

In the 1850s Kansas Territory elections, pro-slavery forces seeking to ratify the Lecompton Constitution carried out voter fraud on multiple occasions by importing pro-slavery people from Missouri to cast ballots. In the 1876 United States presidential election between Republican Rutherford B. Hayes and Democrat Samuel J. Tilden, voter fraud was widespread, with South Carolina reporting an impossible 101 percent turnout. Violence and intimidation against Black Republican voters also occurred. In four contested states, Republicans and Democrats filed separate tallies favoring their respective candidates. The election was ultimately decided by the Congress-appointed Electoral Commission in favor of Hayes.

In the 1888 United States presidential election, there was evidence of voter fraud in some states that favored Republican Benjamin Harrison, particularly in his home state of Indiana. Public backlash contributed to the nationwide implementation of secret ballots. Two races in the 1888 United States House of Representatives elections were also overturned due to fraud. In Arkansas, John M. Clayton lost to Clifton R. Breckinridge after a ballot box with a large majority of Clayton votes was stolen. Clayton was assassinated the following year while challenging the election, but was posthumously declared the winner. In Maryland, Barnes Compton was initially elected, but his opponent Sydney E. Mudd successfully contested the election the following year.

Evidence suggests that the 1892 Alabama gubernatorial election, where Reuben Kolb lost to incumbent Thomas Goode Jones, was decided by fraud. This included ballot boxes being stolen, votes being swayed by bribery or threats, and counties in the Black Belt announcing results before later changing them. Kolb was not allowed by law to contest the results, and lost the gubernatorial race in 1894 under similar circumstances.

=== 20th century ===
Electoral fraud caused some notable United States elections in the 20th century to be affected or annulled. In the early 20th century, electoral fraud was similar in nature to the 19th century. Alabama ratified its 1901 constitution, which remained in effect until 2022, due to widespread electoral fraud in the referendum. In the 1905 New York City mayoral election, there was fraud against William Randolph Hearst linked to the Tammany Hall machine. Hearst lost to George B. McClellan Jr. by 3,472 votes. In the 1918 United States House of Representatives elections in Pennsylvania, Patrick McLane was declared the winner in the 10th district; a congressional committee determined in 1921 that "wholesale fraud" had cheated John R. Farr out of the election, and McLane was unseated. In the 1930s, Huey Long ran a political machine throughout Louisiana with significant voter fraud. Indications of electoral fraud in the 1930 United States Senate election in Louisiana, which Long won, were ubiquitous. According to Long biographer Richard White, "the official record indicated that voters marched to the polls in alphabetical order". In the 1932 United States Senate election in Louisiana, Long's lieutenants allegedly promised the families of inmates that their loved ones would be freed if they voted for Long's endorsed candidate.

1948 Texas U.S. Senate Democratic primary runoff results, with Johnson counties in blue, and Stevenson counties in green

In the 1948 United States Senate election in Texas, according to a 1990 book by historian Robert A. Caro, Democrat Lyndon B. Johnson won his primary against Coke R. Stevenson due to electoral fraud, which included county officials casting ballots for absent voters and changing vote tally numbers. Johnson won the primary by 87 votes, and the Texas Democratic Party executive committee upheld his victory by a vote of 29 to 28. The event became known as the Box 13 scandal, as six days after polls had closed, 202 additional votes were added to the totals for Precinct 13 of Jim Wells County: 200 for Johnson and two for Stevenson.

Some historians believe the 1960 United States presidential election in Illinois, which John F. Kennedy won over Richard Nixon, was decided by fraud. Multiple judges and one independent prosecutor determined that the election was fair, although historian Robert Dallek, who wrote biographies on both candidates, concluded the Chicago machine run by mayor Richard J. Daley "probably stole Illinois from Nixon". According to Politico in 2016, "over a half century after the fact, it's impossible to judge what really happened." Nixon lost the Electoral College and conceded the election the following morning, although he encouraged recount efforts in Illinois and other states, which were shut down after setbacks in several key court hearings. Between 1968 and 1984, eight Democratic primary elections in Brooklyn, New York, were marked by repeated fraud according to the findings of a grand jury. The fraud included multiple voting by teams of political workers with fake voter registration cards.

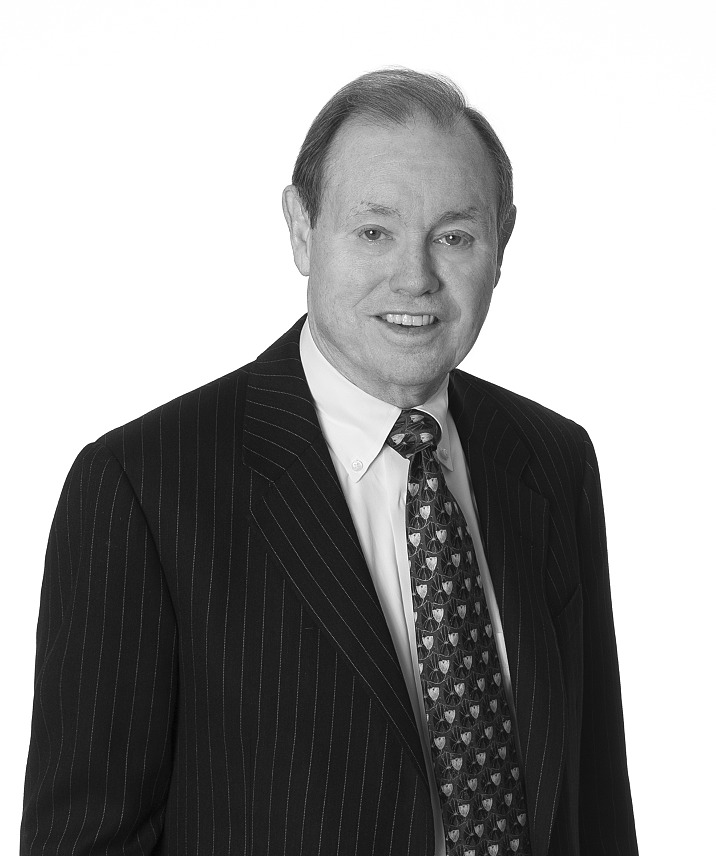
U.S. Attorney Dan K. Webb prosecuted voter fraud in the 1982 Illinois elections.

In the 1982 Illinois elections, there were 62 indictments and 58 convictions for election fraud, many involving precinct captains and election officials. A grand jury concluded that 100,000 fraudulent votes had been cast in Chicago. Authorities found fraud involving vote buying and ballots cast by others in the names of registered voters. The case was prosecuted in November 1982 by U.S. Attorney Dan K. Webb. In the 1987 Chicago mayoral election, two reviews conducted by the Chicago Board of Election Commissioners and an election watchdog group headed by Webb found that tens of thousands of ballots were fraudulently cast in the Democratic primary. In the 1994 Pennsylvania State Senate election, a federal judge invalidated a race in Philadelphia after finding that the Democratic candidate William G. Stinson had stolen the election through absentee ballot fraud. Republicans took control of the State Senate as a result of the ruling.

In the 1996 United States House of Representatives elections in California, the Republican majority on the House Oversight Committee claimed to have found 748 illegal votes cast in the 46th district race between Republican Bob Dornan and Democrat Loretta Sanchez, including 624 by noncitizens. Sanchez won by 979 votes, so it would not have affected the outcome, and the House voted to dismiss Dornan's challenge in February 1998. The findings were highly contested and disputed by the Democratic minority on the committee, who pointed out that about half of those who registered as noncitizens were citizens by the time they cast their ballots. No indictments were brought by a grand jury after a yearslong criminal investigation into Hermandad, an immigrant rights group at the center of fraud allegations. The California Secretary of State did not press charges, concluding in April 1998 that the noncitizens identified had registered in error and not from criminal intent.

The 1997 Miami mayoral election is known for being one of the worst examples of electoral fraud in recent history, with a judge invalidating the result for "a pattern of fraudulent, intentional and criminal conduct" in the casting of absentee ballots. The neighboring city of Hialeah, Florida had its own mayoral contest overturned in 1993, when a judge ruled that so many ballots had been cast from a retirement home housing schizophrenics and drug addicts that the election had to be re-run.

=== 21st century ===
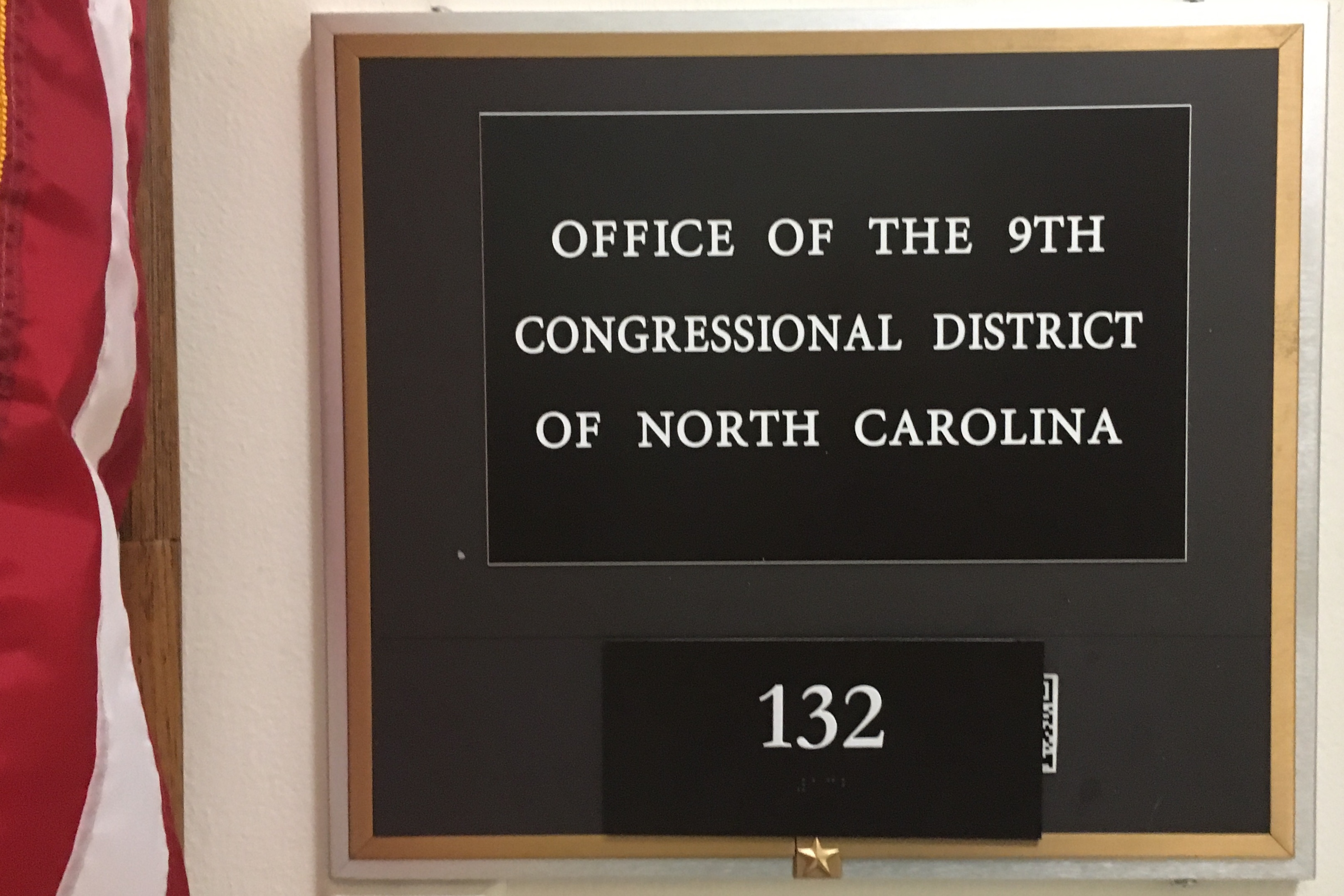
A vacant name plate in the U.S. House of Representatives during the 2018 North Carolina's 9th congressional district election fraud investigation

In the 21st century, there have been scattered examples of electoral fraud affecting the outcome of elections, and attempts at widespread electoral fraud are notable when they occur at all. In 2002, 2004 and 2006, eight prominent Clay County, Kentucky politicians were involved in a scheme to gain control of the local board of elections and fix election outcomes. The group notably included a former U.S. circuit judge and former county school superintendent. In the 2003 East Chicago, Indiana mayoral election, the Indiana Supreme Court invalidated the Democratic primary citing "a widespread and pervasive pattern" of absentee ballot fraud. Forty-six people, mainly city workers, were found guilty in a wide-ranging conspiracy to purchase votes through the use of absentee ballots, which included the coercion of sick people and people with limited English skills.

In 2009 and 2010, Massachusetts state representative Stephen Stat Smith illegally cast absentee ballots for voters who were ineligible or unaware of ballots being cast in their names. Smith pled guilty in 2012 and resigned his seat in 2013. In 2012, Indiana Secretary of State Charles P. White was convicted of multiple voter fraud-related charges, causing him to lose his position. In the 2012 United States House of Representatives elections in Florida, Jeffrey Garcia, chief of staff to 26th district incumbent Joe Garcia, was charged with orchestrating a scheme to illegally request nearly 2,000 absentee ballots. Garcia pled guilty to a misdemeanor. In the 2012 Massachusetts House of Representatives elections, Republican candidate Enrico "Jack" Villamaino and his wife forged more than 280 voters' names on absentee ballot requests. Also in 2012, Cincinnati, Ohio poll worker Melowese Richardson made national headlines for using her position to vote twice. In the 2014 and 2016 Philadelphia elections, former congressman Michael "Ozzie" Myers was found to have bribed election workers to stuff ballot boxes in local races. Myers pled guilty in 2022 and was sentenced to 2 1/2 years in prison.

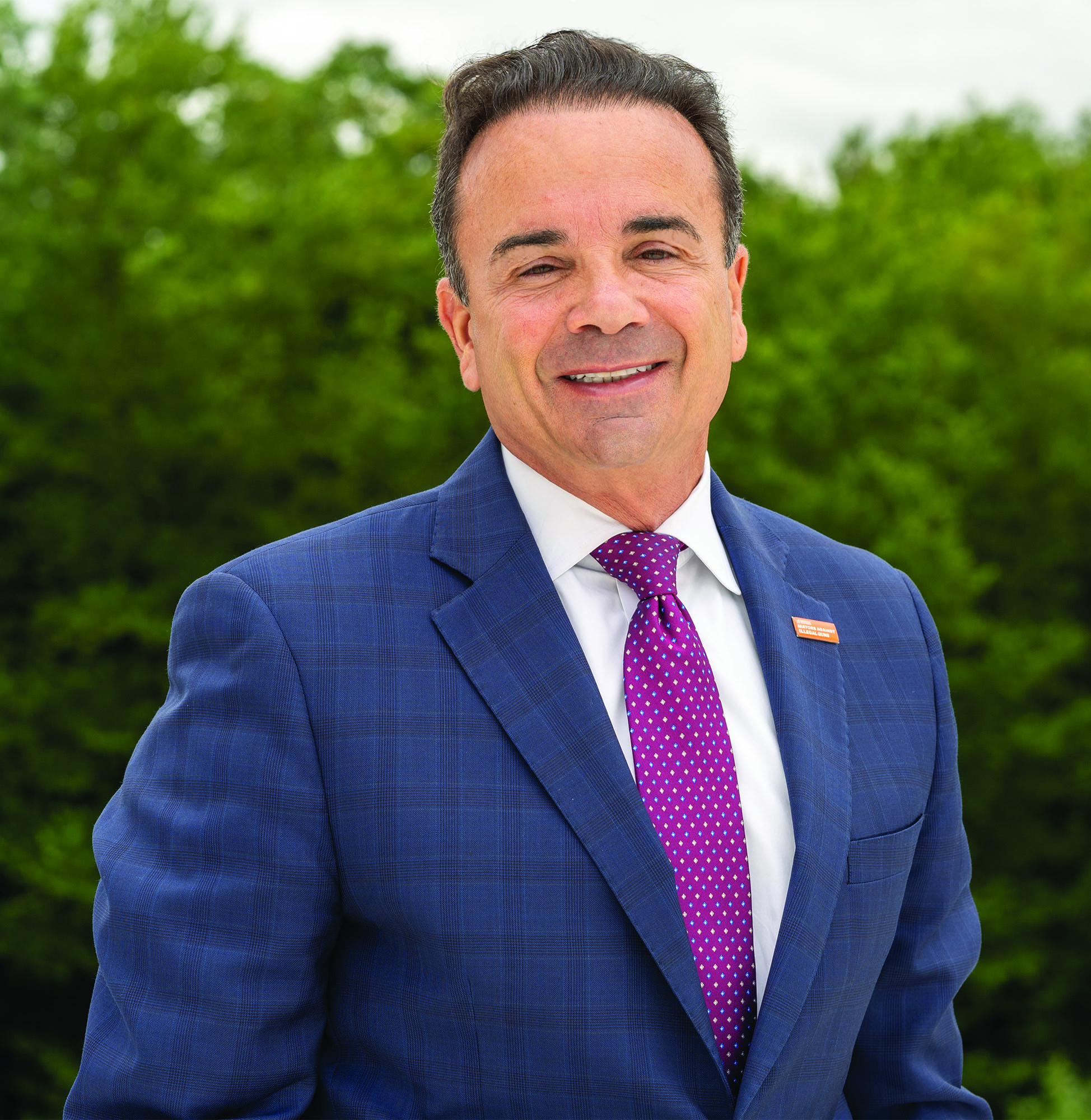
Bridgeport, Connecticut mayor Joe Ganim won re-election in 2024 after a primary invalidated for ballot stuffing.

One of the most notable recent cases of fraud occurred in the 2018 United States House of Representatives elections in North Carolina. The fraud involved a ballot harvesting scheme undertaken by McCrae Dowless, a campaign operative working for Republican congressional candidate Mark Harris in North Carolina's 9th congressional district. Mark Harris initially won the election by 905 votes, but multiple inconsistencies – only 19 percent of ballot requesters were registered Republicans, for example, but 61 percent of absentee voters selected Harris – and credible reports from workers hired by Dowless led to an investigation, refusal by the North Carolina State Board of Elections to certify Harris, a new election (in which Harris did not participate), and the arrest of Dowless and several other Republican party operatives for ballot harvesting and ballot tampering.

In 2022, Southfield, Michigan city clerk Sherikia Hawkins, an elected official and Democrat, pled no contest to a single count of criminal official misconduct after she was accused of falsifying returns and forgery by voiding 193 valid absentee ballots in the 2018 election. She resigned and was sentenced to a single day in jail and ordered to pay a $10,000 fine. In 2024, Kim Phuong Taylor, wife of Republican Iowa congressional candidate Jeremy Taylor, was convicted of 52 counts of voter fraud for illegally filling out or submitting voter registrations and absentee ballots in 2020. In the 2023–24 Bridgeport, Connecticut mayoral election, a judge ordered the Democratic primary to be re-run after ruling that there was enough evidence of ballot stuffing to throw the results into doubt. According to The New York Times, illegal ballot manipulation is not uncommon in Bridgeport elections, and has included apartment residents being pressured to apply for absentee ballots they were not entitled to. Incumbent mayor Joseph Ganim, who had won the initial primary, also won the do-over primary and the general election.

== Public perception ==
A 2021 study found that Republicans and Democrats often define voter fraud differently, with Republicans more likely to define voter fraud as stemming from individual actions whereas Democrats are more likely to point to voter suppression from unfair policies. A 2016 nationwide poll published in The Washington Post found that 84% of Republicans, 75% of independents and 52% of Democrats believed that a "meaningful amount" of fraud occurred in United States elections. A June 2021 Texas Tribune/University of Texas poll found that 19% of Texas voters thought ineligible people "frequently" cast ballots. A series of Monmouth polls conducted between 2020 and 2023 found that 29%–32% of Americans believed the 2020 United States presidential election was fraudulent. A 2024 nationwide NPR/PBS News/Marist poll found 58% of Americans were concerned about voter fraud in the 2024 United States presidential election, including 88% of Donald Trump supporters and 29% of Kamala Harris supporters. A July 2021 poll published by NPR found that more Americans were concerned about ensuring everyone who wanted to could vote (56%) than ensuring that nobody who is ineligible votes (41%). 90% of Democrats said voting access was more important, and 75% of Republicans said stopping ineligible voting was more important.

Research has shown that voters tend to be highly confident in how elections are conducted in their own communities, though are far less confident in the election processes of other states. A Colorado Secretary of State survey after the 2020 election found that 36% of Colorado voters lacked confidence in the national election results, while only 14% lacked confidence in the Colorado election results. A January 2021 study by the Harvard Kennedy School Misinformation Review found that a majority of Donald Trump supporters, particularly those who were more politically knowledgeable and more closely following election news, believed that electoral fraud was widespread. A 2016 study published in State Politics & Policy Quarterly found that Republicans living in states with voter identification laws were on average more confident in their state's elections than Republicans who did not. However Democrats in states with voter identification laws were less confident in their elections than other Democrats. The study found that this dynamic "was polarized and conditioned by party identification". October 2020 polling by University of Miami professor Joseph Uscinski found that 70% of Republicans believed the 2020 presidential election would be rigged with mail-in ballots, but nearly the same number of Democrats believed the election would be rigged by their mail-in ballots not being delivered.

According to Politico, many figures in the 2004 vote-fraud conspiracy movement, which claimed that the 2004 United States presidential election had been stolen from Democrat John Kerry, later believed the 2020 presidential election was stolen from Trump, despite the two being ideological opposites. Flawed research is one factor that can widen a gap in perception that significant voter fraud has occurred between supporters of the candidate that lost an election and the supporters of a candidate that won. A 2023 Political Communication study found that political party elite cues in favor of electoral manipulation could be effective in certain circumstances.

== False and unproven claims ==
=== History ===
False claims of electoral fraud have occurred numerous times in United States history, often with the intention of voter suppression. Exaggerated claims of noncitizen voter fraud date back to the 1800s and usually spike after periods of higher nonwhite immigration. According to Harvard professor Alexander Keyssar, voter fraud allegations in the 19th century were usually made by conservative Protestants against newly arrived immigrants; and while there was more to justify fraud claims back then, they were often exaggerated and used to justify restrictive voting laws. In 1807, New Jersey ended the rights of women to vote with the excuse that men were supposedly dressing as women and voting twice. In 1959, Washington Parish, Louisiana purged 85% of the parish's African American voters despite claiming they were only removing illegal names.

Prominent Republicans such as presidential nominee Bob Dole in 1996, or Republican National Committee chair Ed Gillespie and George W. Bush campaign manager Marc Racicot in 2004, made unsubstantiated claims that voter fraud was occurring in favor of their opponents. Fraud was notably alleged by losing candidates in the closely decided 2004 Washington gubernatorial election and 2008 United States Senate election in Minnesota but nothing that would account for either margin of victory was proven in court. According to columnist Cathy Young, politicians of both parties have made "ill-advised, and sometimes entirely spurious" statements questioning the legitimacy of United States elections – notable Democratic examples include multiple prominent figures after the 2000 United States presidential election and Stacey Abrams in 2018 – though she noted that Republican election denialism after 2020 was "in a vastly different league".

=== 2004 presidential election ===
After the 2004 presidential election, many blogs published rumors claiming to show evidence that voter fraud had prevented Democrat John Kerry from winning. Many conspiracy theories about the election were circulated and promoted. Proponents argued the election was stolen, arguing that votes were switched from Democratic to Republican, that "phantom voters" voted in Ohio, that exit polls that favored Kerry were "more accurate" than the actual result, and that voting machines were rigged to favor Republican George W. Bush. A full statistical analysis of the discrepancies between the exit polls and the official count found that the differences could not have happened by chance. As a result of this, some Democratic members of Congress asked for investigations into the vote count. A 2005 report by Democratic House Judiciary Committee ranking member John Conyers titled What Went Wrong in Ohio claimed that "numerous serious election irregularities" and voter suppression by Republicans had caused Bush to win the state. While some courts before the election found that certain restrictive voting policies of Ohio Secretary of State Ken Blackwell were illegal, claims of voter and machine fraud swaying the election have not achieved mainstream acceptance, and several have been refuted.

=== Claims by Donald Trump ===
==== 2016 presidential election ====
President Donald Trump continued to claim without evidence that between 3 and 5 million people cost him the popular vote to Hillary Clinton by voting illegally. Trump's statements contradict his own lawyers who wrote in response to a 2017 recount petition filed by Jill Stein, "All available evidence suggests that the 2016 general election was not tainted by fraud or mistake."

==== 2020 presidential election ====
During the 2020 presidential campaign, Trump indicated in Twitter posts, interviews and speeches that he might refuse to recognize the outcome of the election if he were defeated; Trump falsely suggested that the election would be rigged against him. Trump repeatedly claimed that "the only way" he could lose would be if the election was "rigged" and repeatedly refused to commit to a peaceful transition of power after the election. Trump also attacked mail-in voting throughout the campaign, falsely claiming that the practice contained high rates of fraud. In September 2020, FBI Director Christopher A. Wray, a Trump appointee, testified under oath that the FBI has "not seen, historically, any kind of coordinated national voter fraud effort in a major election, whether it's by mail or otherwise."

In the lead-up to the election, citing fraud concerns, Republicans filed lawsuits in several states seeking to limit the use of mail-in voting, and prepared to challenge individual mail-in ballots. Republican election lawyer Benjamin Ginsberg criticized his party for this in a November 1, 2020, Washington Post op-ed, writing that over the last four decades, "Republicans found only isolated instances of fraud", and that "Proof of systematic fraud has become the Loch Ness Monster of the Republican Party. People have spent a lot of time looking for it, but it doesn't exist".

Trump claims of electoral fraud in the run-up to elections

After most of the major news organizations declared Biden the President-elect on November 7, Trump refused to accept his loss, declaring "this election is far from over" and alleging election fraud without providing evidence. Multiple lawsuits alleging electoral fraud were filed by the Trump campaign, all of which were dismissed as having no merit. Trump's claims of fraud during the 2020 election were also debunked by his own officials. Republican officials questioned the legitimacy of the election and aired conspiracy theories regarding various types of alleged fraud. In early 2021 along with other elections laws thought to give Republicans an advantage, Trump loyalists in a number of states initiated a push to make voting laws more restrictive.

In December 2021, the Associated Press released a detailed fact-check which found fewer than 475 instances of voter fraud out of an estimated 25 million votes cast in the six battleground states. They involved both Democrats and Republicans and were almost always caught before the votes were counted. While some seemed intentional, others involved clerical error or voter confusion. In October 2024, prosecutors in Trump's DOJ election subversion case argued that they would prove at trial that Trump invented statistics "from whole cloth".

==== 2024 presidential election ====
Trump's false claims of fraud continued into the 2024 presidential campaign. In the 2024 New Hampshire Republican presidential primary, Trump repeated false claims that people from other states voted in the primary. According to The New York Times, Trump escalated use of "rigged election" and "election interference" statements in advance of the 2024 election compared to the previous two elections. The statements were described as part of a "heads I win; tails you cheated" rhetorical strategy. Experts and election officials voiced concerns about another attempt to overturn the results of the election, as well as rising threats and violence. An August 2024 poll found that 17% of Americans were not prepared to accept the outcome of the 2024 election, two-thirds of Americans did not believe Trump is prepared to accept the outcome, and that 34% of survey respondents lacked confidence that votes will be tallied correctly. The Economist wrote that if he were to lose, Trump was "all but certain" to challenge the outcome again. Chris LaCivita, an adviser to Trump, said in July, "It's not over on Election Day, it's over on Inauguration Day."

In 2024, the Republican National Committee (RNC) launched a swing state initiative to mobilize thousands of poll watchers, poll workers and attorneys to observe the election process. The RNC also created hotlines for poll watchers to report perceived problems and escalate issues through legal action. Critics argued that these efforts could undermine trust in elections and were targeted on polling places where more Democrats cast their ballots. The Democracy Defense Project launched a bipartisan effort to counter false narratives of voter fraud in swing states and Ohio..

==== 2026 mid-term election ====
Following a historic wave election during the mid-term elections where Democratic party candidates made gains in both the Senate and House of Representatives, Trump at first accepted the results in the immediate days after the election. He later raised allegations about concerns about the elections integrity about a week after the election on Truth Social writing "Does anybody really believe that this 'Election' was honest". He also raised allegations about the early voting numbers being so "....large that it was impossible to win, no matter how many people went to vote", and that there were issues with the voting machines.

=== Vote flipping on touch screens ===
Claims of vote flipping or vote switching by voting touch screens have consistently been refuted by election experts. They have resurfaced in every national election since 2004, reaching a peak in the 2020 election, after which the Cybersecurity and Infrastructure Security Agency issued a statement, "There is no evidence that any voting system deleted or lost votes, changed votes, or was in any way compromised." With the widespread adoption of direct recording electronic (DRE) touch screen voting technology in the early 2000s, largely funded by the Help America Vote Act of 2002, claims began to surface that votes for one candidate were being "flipped" to the opposing candidate. As the 2004 general election was the first national election since HAVA, it was the first to see this allegation as some Democratic voters in Florida claimed the touch screen changed their vote for John Kerry to a vote for George W. Bush.

CBS News election law contributor David Becker stated that voter error is the cause of every incident he has encountered of an allegedly "flipped" vote. As of November 5, 2024, incidents in the 2024 election have tended to support this assertion. In Georgia, a single voter in Whitfield County selected the wrong candidate during early voting, spotted the error on the paper ballot and corrected her mistake—a human error that quickly became a conspiracy theory after an anonymous Facebook post was shared by Representative Marjorie Taylor Greene. After one voter in Tarrant County, Texas claimed his vote for president had been switched by the machine, county commissioner Alisa Simmons said, "There is zero evidence that that has occurred," suggesting voter error was responsible. On the last day of early voting in Texas, Lieutenant Governor Dan Patrick tweeted that "There have been less than ten allegations of vote flipping out of nearly 7 million votes cast across the state. There has not been a single confirmation that it actually happened."

=== Misinformation and disinformation ===
Through early October 2026, Trump had attacked the integrity of US elections on more than 70% of the days following his 2025 inauguration, repeatedly making false claims.

Voter fraud expert Lorraine Minnite has described Republicans as seizing on misunderstandings of complicated processes around voter roll maintenance to suggest that noncitizens were voting. Mindy Romero of the University of South Carolina said the concern of noncitizens voting is fueled by misinformation, fear and demonization of immigrants. Some claims of voter fraud are described as a dog whistle. The Heritage Foundation was described by The New York Times in September 2024 as publishing misleading content about noncitizen voting, with one such video getting over 56 million views on X. By 2023, Meta, YouTube, and X (formerly Twitter) rolled back efforts to label or remove misinformation about election fraud. CalMatters described True the Vote as one of the organizations promoting exaggerated and false claims, in what David Becker characterized as "an economy of grift" where organizations raise substantial money from donors without delivering the evidence they claimed they had found.

==== By foreign actors ====
Russian operatives have promoted false claims of voter fraud hoping to "further sow doubt in election integrity" in the United States and democracies around the world. According to a U.S. intelligence report in September 2020, Russian intelligence operatives aimed to amplify concerns of United States election integrity such as the reliability of mail-in voting. According to The New York Times, disinformation efforts by autocratic countries led by Russia and China "push narratives undermining democratic governance" designed to "accelerate the recent rise in authoritarian-minded leaders".

=== Consequences ===
False claims of fraud have been noted to lower overall levels of trust in elections. A nationwide study conducted after the 2018 United States elections and published in the Journal of Experimental Political Science found that exposure to claims of voter fraud reduces confidence in electoral integrity, though does not reduce support for democracy itself. Corrective messages from mainstream sources did not measurably reduce this distrust. In some cases, the spreading of fraud claims has been done to lay the groundwork for overturning election results, most notably in the 2020 presidential election. Pervasive claims of voter fraud after the 2020 election linked to the election denial movement were noted to increase the risk of threats to election workers, political violence, and voter intimidation. Concerns about widespread voter fraud despite its rarity are often used as justification for the passage of restrictive voting laws.

== Failed attempts to find widespread fraud ==
=== George W. Bush administration investigations (2001–2006) ===
In response to complaints from conservative watchdog groups and Republican lawmakers, Attorney General John Ashcroft instructed federal prosecutors to make voter fraud a priority, launching more than 300 investigations in 2001. Five years later, the Bush Justice Department disclosed that they had charged 119 people with election crimes and convicted just 86 – most of which were people who cast a single ballot incorrectly or had simply registered improperly and didn't vote at all. Since previous guidelines barred federal prosecutions of "isolated acts of individual wrongdoing" that were not part of schemes to corrupt elections, some prosecutors were uneasy about charging individual voters, leading to a highly publicized dismissal of several U.S. attorneys.

A Justice Department trial attorney said "It's remarkable that all of the U.S. attorneys had a mandate and were given adequate resources to raise this to the top of the pile. They all agree we found a handful of cases … and that was it."

=== Iowa investigation (2012–2014) ===
In 2012, Iowa Secretary of State Matt Schultz ordered a statewide investigation into voter fraud, and after a two-year effort, concluded with only six convictions, the majority of which were felons who mistakenly believed they were eligible to vote. An report issued by the investigation claimed that only 117 votes were cast by ineligible voters, a small fraction of the 1.58 million votes cast in Iowa during the 2012 election, and did not suggest that the outcomes of any Iowa elections were affected by fraudulent votes.

=== Voter fraud commission (2017) ===
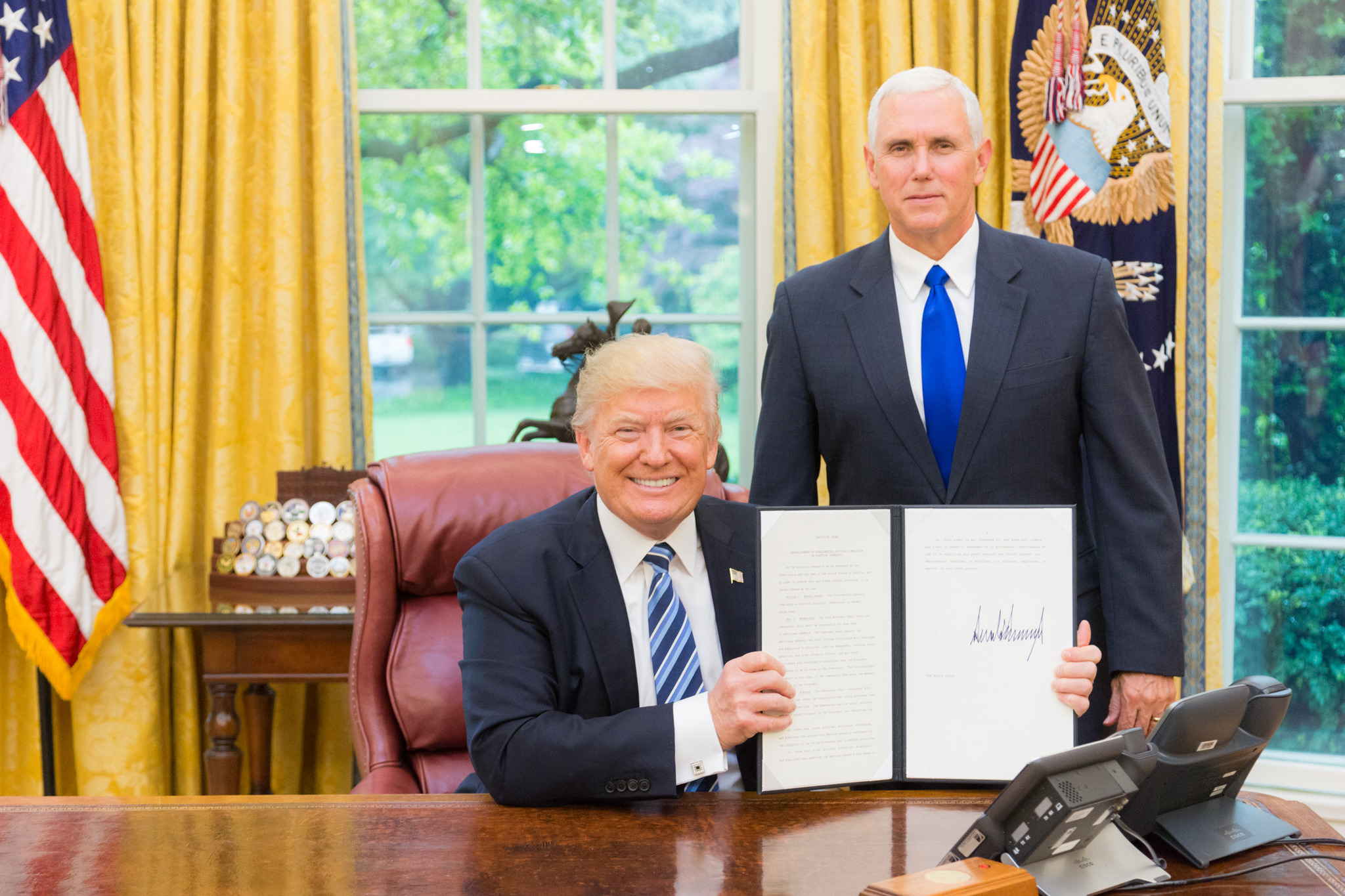
President Trump signing the Executive Order establishing the Voter Fraud Commission

On May 11, 2017, Trump signed an executive order to establish a commission to conduct an investigation into voter fraud, chaired by Vice President Mike Pence with Kansas Secretary of State Kris Kobach as vice chair. Kobach and the commission failed to provide evidence for claims of voter fraud by Trump and others on the commission. Trump's creation of the commission was criticized by voting rights advocates, scholars and experts, and newspaper editorial boards as a pretext for, and prelude to, voter suppression. Matt Dunlap, a Democrat on the commission, called it a sham designed to gin up anti-immigrant sentiment. In January 2018, Trump abruptly disbanded the commission, which met only twice. The commission found no evidence of widespread voter fraud in the United States. Richard Hasen said the commission was supposed to give Trump cover to pass a national documentary proof of citizenship law.

=== 2020 election investigations ===
In the final weeks of 2020, the Trump campaign paid the Berkeley Research Group $600,000 to investigate voter fraud claims in Georgia, Pennsylvania, Michigan, Wisconsin, Arizona and Nevada. The final report, dubbed "Project 2020" undercut Trump's claims by failing to find widespread voter fraud and was never presented to the public or in court.

The 2020 Trump campaign also paid a second firm, the data mining company Simpatico Software Systems, $750,000 to study election fraud claims. Ken Block, the firm's founder, said that he was able to document and prove that every one of the claims was false. "No substantive voter fraud was uncovered in my investigations looking for it." said Block.

In December 2020, Attorney General William Barr told the Associated Press that federal prosecutors and the FBI looked into specific election integrity allegations and concluded that they had not found any evidence of widespread fraud.

=== Kurt Olsen and Mojave Research investigation (2025–2026) ===
In October 2025, the Trump administration hired former Trump campaign lawyer Kurt Olsen as a "special government employee" under the title "Director of Election Security and Integrity" and tasked him with investigating fraud in the 2020 election. At the direction of the president, Olsen was given to access to highly classified intelligence material stored by U.S. spy agencies. In May 2025, the administration seized Dominion voting machines in Puerto Rico in an attempt to prove a discredited conspiracy theory alleging vote-rigging by Venezuela. Tulsi Gabbard, then Director of National Intelligence, contracted the cybersecurity firm Mojave Research to analyze the machines and the firm submitted a report on their findings to her in July 2025. That report has yet to be made public, but sources have told press outlets that it failed to find evidence that weaknesses were exploited or that votes were altered. Reuters reported that the failure to find evidence in Puerto Rico led the administration to expand the investigation to seize election ballots in Georgia, and subpoena voter records in Arizona.

When confronted with the results of Mojave's investigation Olsen reportedly sent a message to Trump accusing the firm of serving the “deep state” and secretly taking money from George Soros. The company denied the allegation and opened its books to show it took no money from Soros.

=== Homeland Security investigations (2025–2026) ===
Starting in the summer of 2025, Homeland Security Investigations, a law enforcement arm of the US Immigration and Customs Enforcement agency, was tasked with finding election fraud cases in the United States, specifically looking for non-citizens who voted. The agency was given access to many state voter rolls, a move that some Department of Justice attorneys considered a breach of privacy and may have been illegal. As of May 2026, only 41 people were charged with voting illegally or other election-related crimes, and only 14 have been convicted.

In September 2026, HSI agents began visiting homes in several states to question people on lists of suspected noncitizen voters. Some of the agents were armed. On October 21, U.S. District Judge Araceli Martinez-Olguin issued a preliminary ruling barring these visits in nine states when agents know or should reasonably suspect the person is a U.S. citizen. She cited a "high likelihood of error" in how DHS built its target lists. DHS said it had no plans to question people it believed to be citizens.

== Prevention ==
States each have different laws and methods to address electoral fraud. Some methods of preventing voter fraud have caused controversy due to their potential to disproportionately impact legal voters and/or certain demographic groups. A 2018 report released by the National Academies of Sciences, Engineering, and Medicine recommended that states undergo regular election audits, cross-check voter registrations nationwide for duplicates, and adopt systems for voters to verify receipt and delivery of mail ballots. The report called for investments to improve election technology and administration; including technology to prevent coercion or vote buying with mail ballots, and identity verification technology at the polls such as biometric markers. It also recommended the use of paper ballots and a ban on internet voting.

=== Voter ID laws ===
In the United States, voter ID laws (laws requiring identification to vote) have been enacted in 36 states as of 2024 with the stated aim of preventing voter impersonation. They have mostly been introduced by Republican legislators since 2011. Specific forms of ID required vary between states, with some requiring photo identification. Some laws have been struck down in court as an undue burden. Voter ID requirements are generally popular among Americans, though they are also a divisive issue. Critics of voter ID laws have argued that they depress turnout by lawful voters under the pretense of addressing voter impersonation, which is quite rare. Americans who have lower incomes, are younger or transgender are less likely to have an updated ID.

=== Citizenship verification ===
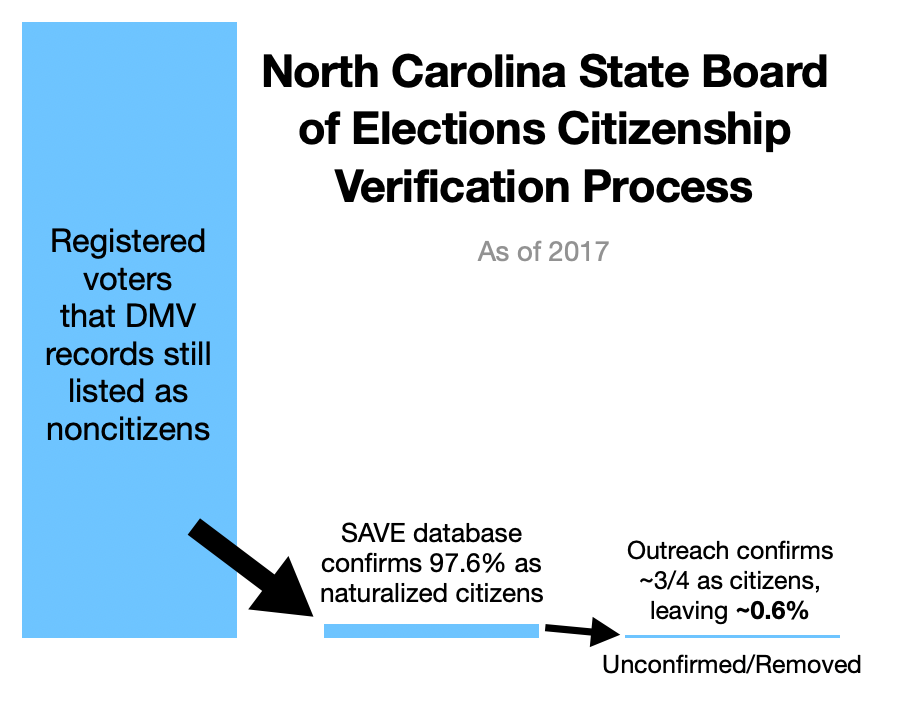
Citizenship verification process in North Carolina as of 2017

The process of verifying the citizenship of voters varies by state. It is best practice for states to check registrations against DMV or Social Security files to check for noncitizens. Some methods states have tried have been discontinued due to errors or legal fights. Some states and counties like Kansas, New Jersey and Allegheny County, Pennsylvania do not independently verify proof of citizenship.

According to the North Carolina State Board of Elections in 2017, DMV data indicating noncitizenship is just the first step in determining someone's citizenship status because, "voters who appear to be non-citizens based on DMV data were confirmed to be U.S. citizens in the SAVE database 97.6 percent of the time." If the status was then also listed as noncitizen in the Systematic Alien Verifications for Entitlements database, the Board asked for more proof in mailings and interviews since 3/4 of those who had been able to provide proof of citizenship, remained listed in the SAVE database as noncitizens.

Georgia compares voter rolls to Social Security Administration and its Department of Driver Services, while Colorado uses the SAVE database as-needed. In Georgia, if someone's citizenship cannot be verified who registers to vote, they are put into a 'pending citizenship' status and prevented from registering. Texas requires court clerks to notify the secretary of state of those disqualified from jury duty for being noncitizens.

In Nevada, the state DMV does not pass along citizenship information to counties when they make voter registration checks, meaning that noncitizen registration is technically possible if applicants lie on their registration form. According to the Bipartisan Policy Center as of July 2024, access to federal citizenship data is "difficult, costly, and burdensome", and state election officials have "long struggled" to obtain it. Between January 2023 and July 2024, nine states instituted laws to solidify citizenship verification for voting and voter registration; mostly by improving data collaboration with state resources and federal databases.

==== Proof of citizenship laws ====
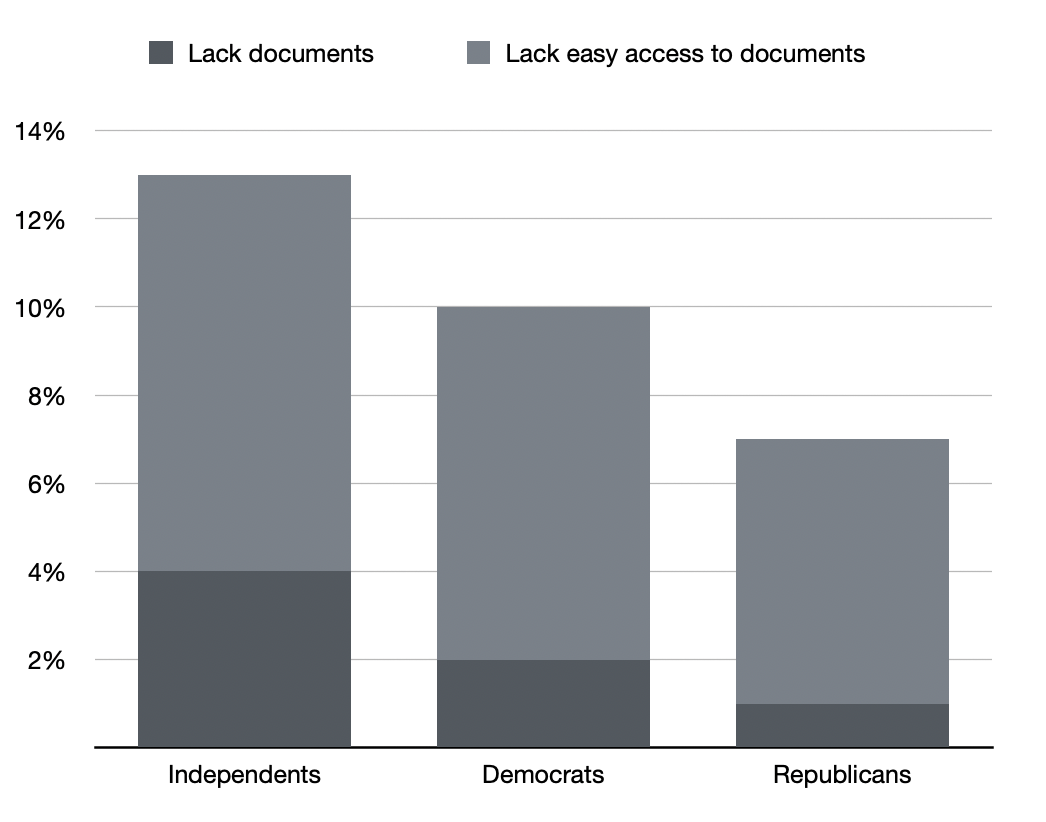
Lack of citizenship documentation by political party (2024)

Proof of citizenship laws require people who vote or register to vote to present documentary proof of citizenship. Proponents have argued that they are necessary to prevent illegal noncitizen voting, while critics have said that noncitizen voting essentially does not occur and that the laws would disenfranchise large percentages of eligible voters who lack easy access to such documents, such as college students, tribal voters, or low-income voters. A June 2024 Brennan Center study estimates that 21.3 million citizens (9% of voters) do not have easy access to documentary proof of citizenship, and that 3.8 million citizens lack access to any form, often because documents were lost, damaged or stolen.

The legality of proof of citizenship laws has been disputed. In the 2013 Arizona v. Inter Tribal Council of Arizona, Inc., the U.S. Supreme Court ruled that Arizona's proof of citizenship law violated the 1993 National Voter Registration Act for federal elections. In August 2024, in Republican National Committee v. Mi Familia Vota the Supreme Court allowed Arizona to enforce a law requiring proof of citizenship to register to vote using the state's registration forms (federal forms do not require documentation), pending appeal. In July 2024, the United States House of Representatives passed the Safeguard American Voter Eligibility (SAVE) Act, which would mandate that Americans show documentary proof of citizenship when registering to vote and make it easier to sue election workers who register a noncitizen. The bill died after not being considered by the Senate. The Bipartisan Policy Center argued there are better ways to ensure noncitizens do not vote, such as better data sharing between state departments, such as data provided to a DMV when attaining a REAL ID.

In the 2018 Fish v. Kobach case, U.S. District Court Judge Julie Robinson ruled that Kansas' proof of citizenship law was unconstitutional, in part because the state did not demonstrate that any meaningful illegal noncitizen voting occurred and that 31,089 citizens without the right documentation had their voter registration cancelled or suspended. In a 2023 case in Arizona, U.S. District Judge Susan R. Bolton struck down the documentary proof of citizenship requirement along similar lines but upheld some provisions, citing as credible estimates of 2022 noncitizen voting rates by Jesse Richman, which other scholars have disputed.

=== Signature verification ===
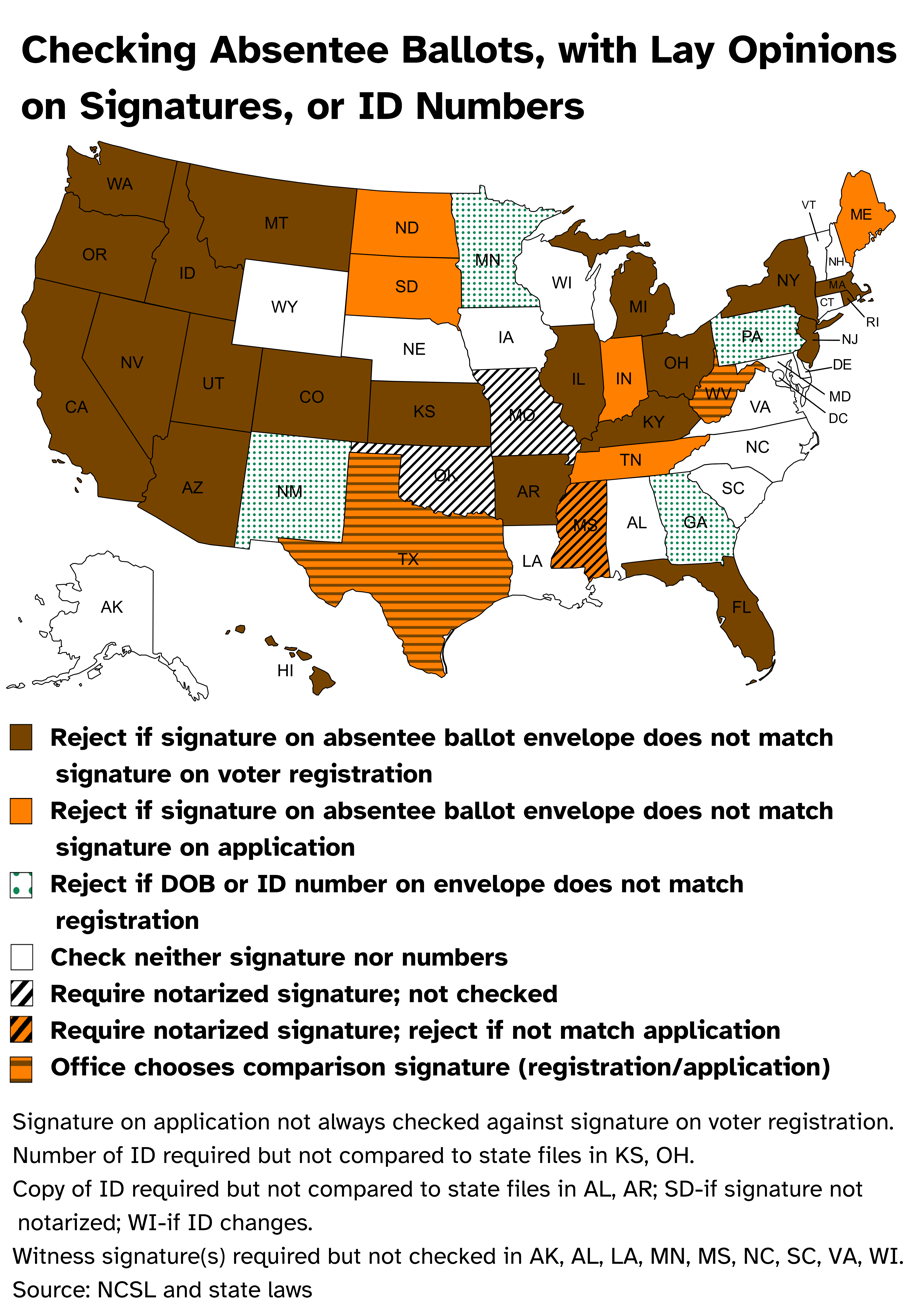
Signature rejection thresholds by state (2023)

Signature verification is carried out by a majority of states in order to prevent forged paper ballots. According to the Election Administration and Voting Survey, 27.5% of rejected absentee ballots in 2016, and 15.8%, of rejected mail-in ballots in 2018, were due to signature mismatches. Tossing ballots due to signature mismatches can depend on the method of signature verification used.

As of 2024, 31 states conduct signature verification on returned absentee or mail-in ballots. Nine states do not conduct signature verification, but require the signature of either a witness, two witnesses, or a notary. Ten states and Washington, D.C., neither conduct signature verification nor require a witness signature. Mississippi is the only state to both conduct signature verification and require a witness signature (in this case, a notary). Four states (Arkansas, Georgia, Minnesota, and Ohio) additionally require either a copy of the voter's ID or a voter identification number.

In 2024, in Mesa County, Colorado, signature verification successfully detected around a dozen mail ballots that were stolen and fraudulently submitted on behalf of other voters. Three of the ballots had been wrongly accepted and counted after they were flagged by the automated system, but subsequently reviewed and approved by an election judge.

Experts have stated that disenfranchisement caused by mail-in ballots being discarded on technicalities, including non-matching or missing signatures, is a more pervasive problem than mail-in ballot fraud. Researchers at Protect Democracy found that "an explosion of misinformation" about how much cheating occurs among voters using mail-in ballots caused a spike in rejected signatures during the 2021 Georgia Senate runoffs compared to the 2020 presidential election.

=== Marking ballots ===
Because it is standard procedure for ballots cast in-person to not contain identifying information about the voter, if an illegal in-person ballot is cast, it can be impossible to isolate it and prevent it from counting. Some states mark ballots with identifying numbers in certain circumstances. For example, an election worker in Maine will write a number on a ballot only if it is challenged, and election workers in North Carolina write identifying numbers on early in-person and mail-in ballots, which allows ballots to be retrieved and not counted if necessary.

=== Election audits ===
As of 2024, 48 states conduct some type of post-election audit, which check if the equipment and procedures used to count votes worked properly, and detect discrepancies using a hand count of paper records. The two exceptions are Alabama and New Hampshire, both of which nonetheless piloted different audit types in 2022. The type and scope of audit significantly varies between states.

=== Voter roll management ===
Voter roll management seeks to balance sometimes competing interests of ensuring accurate voter rolls, protecting voter privacy and not disenfranchising or creating undue burdens on voters.

==== Voter roll purges ====
Voter caging is the process of challenging the voter registration status of someone who is registered to vote. It often involves sending that person a postcard to the address on file and removing the voter if they do not respond within a certain time period. The practice can be controversial with some civil rights groups successfully suing some states that target voters of a particular political party or race in such a way as to make it meaningfully impact election outcomes and voter's rights.

==== Interstate databases ====
The Interstate Voter Registration Crosscheck Program was a database established in 2005 and run by Kansas that compared voting records across multiple states to prevent double voting. At least 28 states opted into the program, but academics and several states found that it returned high rates of false positives that would disenfranchise legal voters. Some states left as a result. In 2017, the program was put on hold after the Department of Homeland Security discovered security vulnerabilities. In 2019, the program was indefinitely suspended as part of a settlement of a class-action lawsuit filed by the American Civil Liberties Union. Earlier in 2012, the Electronic Registration Information Center (ERIC) was established with a goal of improving the accuracy of voter rolls through comparisons between states. At its peak, 33 states and the District of Columbia were members. Beginning in 2022, nine Republican-led states left ERIC. States cited complaints about governance issues, including that ERIC mailed newly eligible voters who had not yet registered ahead of federal elections, and that it had become subject to alleged partisan influence. ERIC was the subject of repeated false claims from allies of Donald Trump that it was a voter registration vehicle for Democrats. Several states that left ERIC subsequently created their own partnerships.

== Prosecution ==
In most states, a prosecutor must prove that an individual committed voter fraud intentionally or knowingly. In some states, however, any mistake on the part of a voter that leads to voting illegally can be grounds for prosecution. An election crime becomes a federal crime if the ballot includes one or more federal candidates, an election official is involved, election workers are threatened, or the crime relates to fraudulent voter registration or noncitizen voting. The Federal Bureau of Investigation defines voter or ballot fraud as one of three broad categories of federal election crimes; the other two being campaign finance violations and civil rights violations, such as voter intimidation or suppression.

According to The New York Times, prosecutions of voter fraud can lead to significantly varied outcomes depending on socioeconomic status and the state in which someone is being tried. Most violations "draw wrist-slaps", while some high-profile prosecutions have produced multiple-year jail terms. Often, prosecutions net people who did not realize they were breaking the law. Lorraine Minnite has argued that almost all cases of illegal voting are due to misunderstandings or administrative error, which does not constitute fraud in states where intent is required. Prosecutions are exceedingly rare; as of 2022, an average of one and a half people per state per year were charged with voter fraud. Cases of voter fraud can be difficult to prove or prosecute, depending on the type of fraud alleged. According to Bob Hall, former director of Democracy North Carolina, political will is especially required to investigate more complicated electoral fraud schemes, and prosecutors are more inclined to pursue easier cases such as when someone illegally votes while on probation.

Between 1970 and 2005, fewer than 40 people were convicted for illegal voting in Florida, and only two were sent to prison. The Tampa Bay Times attributed this to fraud largely being ignored by prosecutors "unless an election is questioned, someone complains or a voter is investigated on other charges". Wisconsin Watch evaluated voter fraud cases from 2012 to 2022 and found about 0.0006% of votes cast were challenged by a district attorney, with a voter's probation status as the most common reason. A 2022 investigation by KING-TV found that the likelihood of being charged for voter fraud in Washington state varied depending on the county; King County, with a voting population of 1.3 million, had charged 9 cases of voter fraud since 2007, while the much smaller Lewis County had charged 8 (at least 3 of which were dismissed). King County tended to write warning letters for isolated cases, such as a partner who cast the ballot of a recently deceased spouse, and focus prosecutions on cases where a repeat offense was more likely, such as canvassing fraud. The United States Department of Justice publishes Federal Prosecution of Election Offenses, a handbook for district election officers. The 2017 edition warns against launching public investigations, without approval granted for extraordinary cases, into alleged fraud before an election is over so as not to tip the election with the publicity generated by an unfinished investigation.

=== Standing in lawsuits ===
In the aftermath of the 2020 presidential election, many courts ruled against plaintiffs in voter fraud lawsuits on the basis that they, as voters, lacked standing. According to University of Memphis law professor Steven Mulroy, who was critical of some court dismissals based on standing, election cases raise unique standing challenges as the asserted harms are often split between many people. A novel type of vote dilution claim based on fraud has been employed by Republicans since 2020, and is based on the idea that election rules that make it too easy to cast fraudulent votes can dilute the strength of valid ones. Claims of this nature were not successful in 2020 though have since received some success in federal district courts.

== See also ==
- Election integrity in the United States
