= Bob Hall =

Bob Hall may refer to:

- Bob Hall (American motoring journalist) (born 1953)
- Bob Hall (American political journalist), executive director of Democracy NC
- Bob Hall (wheelchair athlete) (1951–2026), American wheelchair athlete and designer
- Bob Hall (Australian rules footballer) (1908–1999), Australian rules footballer
- Bob Hall (outfielder) (1878–1950), Major League Baseball infielder/outfielder
- Bob Hall (pitcher) (1923–1983), Major League Baseball pitcher
- Bob Hall (musician) (born 1942), English musician
- Bob Hall (comics) (born 1944), comic book illustrator, co-creator of The West Coast Avengers
- Bob Hall (ice hockey) (1899–1950), American ice hockey player
- Bob Hall (New Brunswick politician), Canadian politician, member of the 50th New Brunswick Legislature
- Bob Hall (politician) (born 1942), Texas state senator
- Bob Hall (British journalist) (1945–2022), British sports journalist

== See also ==
- Robert Hall (disambiguation)
