= Albert Hall (disambiguation) =

Royal Albert Hall is a building in London.

Albert Hall may also refer to:

== People ==
- Albert Hall (actor) (born 1937), American actor
- Albert Hall (athlete) (1934–2008), American hammer thrower
- Albert Hall (baseball) (1958–2025), American baseball outfielder
- Albert Hall (engineer) (1878–1941), English engineer and inventor
- Albert Hall (footballer, born 1918) (1918–1998), footballer who played for Tottenham Hotspur and Plymouth Argyle
- Albert R. Hall (Indiana politician) (1884–1969), U.S. Representative from Indiana
- Albert R. Hall (Minnesota and Wisconsin politician) (1841–1905)
- Albert Sereno Hall (1830–1863), American military officer
- Bert Hall (1885–1948), actor and military aviator
- Bert Hall (cricketer) (fl. 1902)
- Bert Hall (footballer, born 1882) (1882–1957), footballer who played for Aston Villa and England

== Buildings ==
- Albert Hall, Adelaide (1880–1899), an entertainment venue in Adelaide, Australia
- Albert Hall, Brisbane, a former church hall and theatre in Brisbane, Australia
- Albert Hall, Canberra, a building in Canberra, Australia
- Albert Hall, Colchester, a building in Colchester, Essex, UK
- Albert Hall, Launceston, a building in Launceston, Tasmania, Australia
- Albert Hall Museum, Jaipur, India
- Albert Hall, Llandrindod Wells, a theatre in Llandrindod Wells, Wales, UK
- Albert Hall Music Hall, a former music hall in Kingston-upon-Hull, England, UK
- Albert Hall, Manchester, England, UK
- Albert Hall, Nottingham, a conference centre and concert hall in Nottingham, England, UK
- College Street Coffee House, It was formerly known as Albert Hall which was connected with many historical meetings and seminars in Kolkata.

== Other uses ==
- GWR 4900 Class 4965 Rood Ashton Hall or Albert Hall, a steam locomotive

== See also ==
- Bert Hall (disambiguation)
