= Robert Hall =

Robert Hall may refer to:

== Business and economics ==
- Robert Taggart Hall (1877–1920), American owner of ceramics business
- Robert M. Hall (1909–1998), American media executive and publisher
- Robert Hall, Baron Roberthall (1901–1988), Australian economist and adviser
- Robert Hall (Canadian businessman) (1949–2016), Canadian businessman kidnapped and killed by terrorists
- Robert E. Hall (born 1943), American economist

== Entertainment ==
- Robert Browne Hall (1858–1907), American musician
- Robert David Hall (born 1947), American actor
- Robert Green Hall (1973–2021), American director and special effects artist
- Robert Hall, birth name of Lord Finesse (born 1970), American hip hop producer
- Robert Hall, alternative name of Jefferson Hall (actor) (born 1977), English actor
- Logic (rapper) (Sir Robert Bryson Hall II, born 1990), American rapper, singer and songwriter

== Military ==
- Robert Hall (1814–1899), Texas settler, soldier, and Texas Ranger, see Robert Hall House
- Robert Hall (Royal Navy officer) (1817–1882), Royal Navy officer
- Robert Hall (RAF officer) (1890–1965), World War I flying ace
- Robert Hall (National Guard officer) (1895–1962), officer in the North Dakota Army National Guard in WWII
- Robert Hall (aircraft designer) (1905–1991), American aircraft designer and test pilot
- Robert E. Hall (soldier) (born 1947), U.S. Army Senior NCO and eleventh Sergeant Major of the Army

== Politics ==
- Robert Hall (MP for York) (died 1565), MP for City of York
- Robert Hall (MP for Beverley) (fl. 1563), MP for Beverley
- Robert Hall (MP for Hastings) (died 1536), MP for Hastings
- Robert Hall (MP for Leeds) (1801–1857), English politician, member of parliament for Leeds
- Robert Newton Hall (1836–1907), lawyer, educator, judge and political figure in Quebec
- Robert Hanley Hall (1850–1924), Irish-born fur trader and political figure in British Columbia
- Robert Richard Hall (1865–1938), Canadian politician
- Robert Bernard Hall (1812–1868), member of the U.S. House of Representatives from Massachusetts
- Robert S. Hall (1879–1941), U.S. Representative from Mississippi
- Bob Hall (politician) (Robert Lee Hall, born 1942), member of the Texas State Senate
- Robert A. Hall (1946–2024), Massachusetts state senator
- Robert Hall (Antiguan politician) (1909–1994), deputy premier of Antigua and Barbuda
- Robert Hall (New Brunswick politician) (1930–2016), NDP member for Tantamar
- Robert Hall (British Army officer) (1939–2016), British Army officer and politician
- Sir Robert de Zouche Hall (1904–1995), English colonial governor
- Rob Hall (politician), member of the Oklahoma House of Representatives

== Religion ==
- Robert Hall, the elder (1728–1791), English Particular Baptist minister in Leicestershire
- Robert Hall (minister) (1764–1831), English Baptist minister
- Robert Bruce Hall (1921–1985), bishop of the Episcopal Diocese of Virginia
- Robert Hall (priest) (died 1667), Anglican priest

== Science ==
- Robert Hall (ornithologist) (1867–1949), Australian ornithologist
- Robert E. Hall (physician) (1924–1995), American physician and abortion rights advocate
- Robert L. Hall (1927–2012), American anthropologist
- Robert N. Hall (1919–2016), American engineer, responsible for work on semiconductor optics

== Sports ==
- Robert Hall (basketball) (1927–2014), American basketball player for Harlem Globetrotters
- Robert Hall (cricketer) (born 1963), English cricketer for Herefordshire
- Robert Hall (footballer) (born 1993), Oxford United footballer
- Robert Hall (gridiron football) (born 1970), American football and Canadian football quarterback and wide receiver
- Robert Hall (shot putter) (born 1911), American shot putter and discus thrower, winner of the 1931 NCAA shot put championships

== Other ==
- Robert B. Hall (Japanologist) (1896–1975), American geographer
- Robert A. Hall Jr. (1911–1997), American linguist
- Robert Howell Hall (1921–1995), U.S. federal judge
- Rob Hall (1961–1996), New Zealand mountain guide
- Robert Hall (journalist) (active since 1977), British journalist
- Robert Hall Clothes (1937–1977), American retail company
- Robert Lee Hall (1922–1990), architect based in Memphis, Tennessee

== See also ==
- Bob Hall (disambiguation)
- Bert Hall (disambiguation)
