= Bert Hall (disambiguation) =

Bert Hall (1885–1948) was an American aviator and writer.

Bert Hall may also refer to:

- Bert Hall (cricketer), English cricketer
- Bert Hall (baseball) (1889–1948), Major League Baseball pitcher
- Bert Hall (footballer, born 1880) (1880–1968), Australian rules footballer
- Bert Hall (footballer, born 1882) (1882–1957), English footballer who played for Aston Villa

== See also ==
- Albert Hall (disambiguation)
- Bertram Hall, Radcliffe College
- Robert Hall (disambiguation)
- Herbert Hall (disambiguation)
