= Herbert Hall =

Herbert Hall may refer to:

- Herb Hall (musician) (1907–1996), American jazz clarinetist and alto saxophonist
- Herb Hall (baseball) (1893–1970), Major League Baseball pitcher
- Herbert Hall (bishop) (1889–1955), bishop of Aberdeen and Orkney, Scotland
- Herbie Hall (1926-2013), British Olympic wrestler

== See also ==
- Bert Hall (disambiguation)
