= Bob Hall (Australian rules footballer) =

Australian rules footballer, born 1908

Personal information
- Full name: Robert John Hall
- Born: 25 October 1908; Carlton, Victoria
- Died: 26 April 1999 (aged 90)
- Height: 174 cm (5 ft 9 in)

Playing career^{1}
Years	Club	Games (Goals)
1929	Fitzroy	1 (0)
- ^{1} Playing statistics correct to the end of 1929.

Robert John Hall (25 October 1908 – 26 April 1999) was an Australian rules footballer who played with Fitzroy in the Victorian Football League (VFL).
