= State Politics & Policy Quarterly =

Academic journal

- Discipline: Political science
- Language: English
- Edited by: Jon Winburn, Tracy Osborn, Conor Dowling

Publication details
- History: 2001-present
- Publisher: Cambridge University Press
- Frequency: Quarterly
- Impact factor: 1.425 (2017)

Standard abbreviations
- ISO 4: State Politics Policy Q.

Indexing
- ISSN: 1532-4400
- LCCN: 00212594
- OCLC no.: 45351990

Links
- Journal homepage; Online access; Online archive

State Politics & Policy Quarterly is a peer-reviewed academic journal that covers research in the field of political science. The journal's editors are Jon Winburn, Conor Dowling, and Tracy Osborn. It was established in 2001 and is currently published by Cambridge University Press in association with the State Politics Section of the American Political Science Association.

== Abstracting and indexing ==
State Politics & Policy Quarterly is abstracted and indexed in Scopus and the Social Sciences Citation Index. According to the Journal Citation Reports, the journal has a 2017 impact factor of 1.425, ranking it 69th out of 169 journals in the category "Political Science".

== See also ==
- List of political science journals
