= Election Law Journal =

- Discipline: Election law
- Language: English
- Edited by: David Canon, University of Wisconsin-Madison

Publication details
- History: 2002-present
- Publisher: Mary Ann Liebert, Inc.
- Frequency: Quarterly

Standard abbreviations
- ISO 4: Elect. Law J.

Indexing
- ISSN: 1533-1296 (print); 1557-8062 (web)
- LCCN: 2001211507
- OCLC no.: 49342856

Links
- Journal homepage; Online access

Election Law Journal: Rules, Politics, and Policy is a quarterly peer-reviewed law journal published by Mary Ann Liebert, Inc. covering legal issues related to elections and voting rights. It was established in 2002 with Daniel H. Lowenstein (UCLA School of Law) and Richard L. Hasen (Loyola Law School) as founding editors-in-chief. Election Law Journal is abstracted and indexed in Westlaw and International Political Science Abstracts/Documentation Politique Internationale.

== Editors ==
As of 2026, the editor-in-chief was Marc Meredith, University of Pennsylvania. As of 2010, the editors were Daniel P. Tokaji (Moritz College of Law) and Paul Gronke (Reed College). As of 2018, the editor-in-chief was David Canon, University of Wisconsin-Madison.
