= News21 =

Student reporting project

News21 is a student reporting project created by the Carnegie Corporation of New York and the John S. and James L. Knight Foundation, and based at Arizona State University's Walter Cronkite School of Journalism. The project aims to, according to Coburn Dukehart, support and encourage "new forms of investigative reporting and storytelling."

== History ==
Carnegie and Knight established News21 in 2005 as part of their joint "Carnegie-Knight" initiative at 5 universities. The program is now open to all journalism schools in the United States, and has also included fellows from Puerto Rico, Canada and Ireland. Since 2008, the Cronkite School has been the recipient of nearly $10 million in grants from the two foundations to support the News21 program.

== Structure ==
News21 is based at Arizona State University, but includes other "incubator" universities where the student members of the project learn journalism skills. The universities included in the program change every year. During the spring semester, students take part in a News21 issues seminar taught by News21 Executive Editor Jacqueline Petchel. The seminar immerses students in the topic to be investigated by News21 in the summer and students do preliminary reporting. Completed articles are then published by local news organizations and major media outlets, including The Washington Post, NBC News and USA Today.

== Projects ==
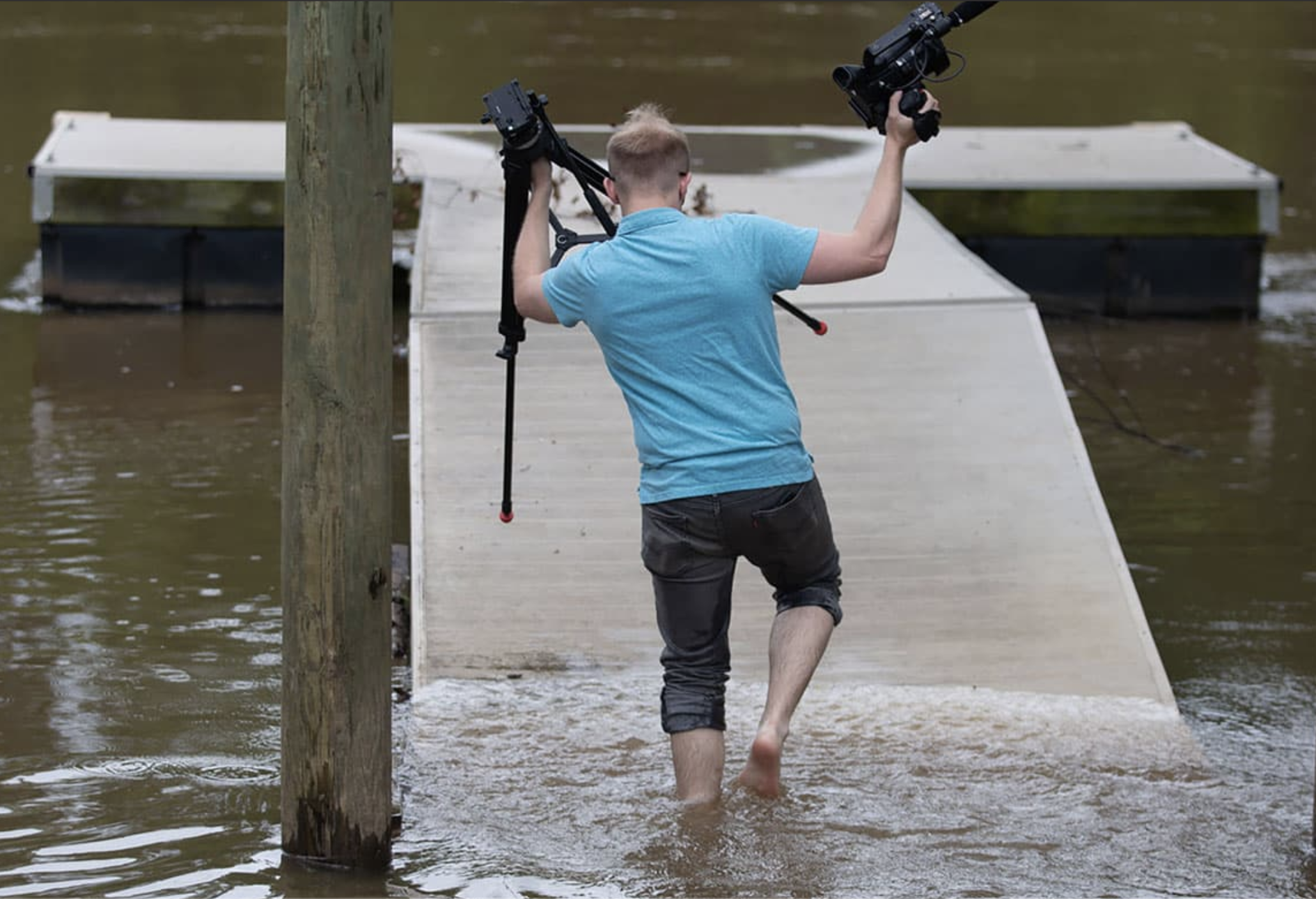
News21 fellow Ben Sessoms works on the 2019 project State of Emergency.

News21's projects include one about gun control in the United States called "Gun Wars: The Struggle Over Rights and Regulation in America." The results of this investigation were released on August 15, 2014, after five months of research. They also analyzed more than 2,000 reported cases of possible voter fraud in the United States from 2000 to 2012 and found that only 10 of them were for voter impersonation. Other subjects they have investigated as part of such projects include the lives of veterans in the U.S., the experience one family in Louisiana had after the Deepwater Horizon oil spill, and the variation in medical cannabis laws from state to state.

News21 also produced a report on hate crimes in the United States, called Hate in America. In 2019, News21 investigated federal and state responses to natural disaster, which culminated in the project State of Emergency. The project included a four-part documentary series, a podcast, and Faces of Disaster, a multimedia package that profiled survivors across the country.
