= Alamance 12 =

12 people charged with voting illegally

The Alamance 12 are twelve people in Alamance County, North Carolina who were charged with voting illegally in the 2016 presidential election.

In December 2017 the district attorney of Alamance County charged twelve people for voting as convicted felons. All twelve were either on felony probation or parole when they voted. Five of the defendants stated, in separate interviews with The New York Times, that their votes were based on a misunderstanding of relevant law and procedures. Those charged did not know each other before the arrest, but they became known as the "Alamance 12" due to the similarity of their charges. The Southern Coalition for Social Justice in Durham filed requests to dismiss the charges because the 1901 law was intended to suppress black voting. Several of the twelve pleaded their cases down to misdemeanors.
