= Albert Hall Music Hall =

Music hall in Kingston upon Hull, England

Coordinates: 53°44′34.0″N 0°20′48.8″W

The Albert Hall Music Hall on 10 Midland Street was one of the first music halls built in Kingston upon Hull, England. The building is believed to have been built following the creation of Midland Street, and officially opened for the first time in 1874. It was turned into a saloon bar and pub in the early 20th century, before its final transformation into a bingo hall in the 1970s.

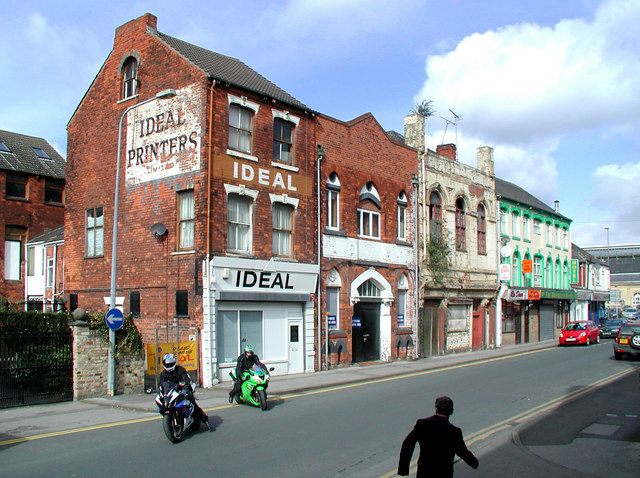
Midland Street in Hull. The Albert Hall can be seen third from the left.

In 2015, the Hull City Council served a Section 215 notice on the building's private owners, ordering them to repair and restore it by the end of the month or pay the bill for its subsequent demolition. The building was considered to be in a potentially dangerous condition after a survey was carried out following a fire in May 2015 at a neighbouring building. It was partially demolished in June 2015. The building is currently owned by Tawazun London Limited.

== History ==
Following the creation of Hull Paragon Station, Midland Street made a direct link from the then new railway station to Osborne Street, Porter Street and the surrounding areas. As it faced the station entrance the new street was officially named Midland Street in 1859.

Plans confirm that the Albert Hall was a somewhat speculative venture, built in April 1873 by a local merchant William Fussey. The first plans show a simple warehouse on two levels with no use attributed to either floor. A decision was soon made for the use of the new building however, as a year later plans were drawn-up for two tiny ‘dressing rooms’ with a ‘kitchen below’ that were attached to the north-west wall of the building. These plans refer to the building as the ‘Albert Hall Inn’ and were dated and approved in April 1874. The dressing rooms suggest Mr Fussey’s immediate incursion into the entertainment business, which was already a family interest, and the use of music hall acts.

The success or otherwise of the Albert Hall in Hull as a music venue is unclear but in 1890 historian Edmund Wrigglesworth noted it was ‘occasionally used as a place of entertainment’ in his ‘Guide to Hull’. Certainly it was rarely if ever described as a music hall per-se, and was noted mostly as the Albert Hall Inn, simply as a public house. Evidence of its theatrical use does exist in the form of a promotional leaflet, which notes the hall as the Royal Albert Hall and gives details of a performance of an Irish Drama ‘The Colleen Dawn’ [Bawn] performed in October 1886 by the Hull Thespian Society.

Following heavy bombing during the Second World War, many of the city's historical buildings were subsequently destroyed. These events, alongside the creation of societies such as The Victorian Society in 1958, heightened the need for the protection of the city's historical buildings such as the Albert Hall. Now a pub, the building received a full on-license in March 1953. At this point living accommodation was constructed at the rear of the premises with a kitchen and lounge taking the space of the former smaller billiards room with three bedrooms and a bathroom above. The Albert Hall closed in 1965 when its licence was transferred to the Schooner, a new pub on Anlaby Park Road North. From the late 1960s it was developed as a Bingo Hall and was known as the Fair & Square Club in the 1970s.

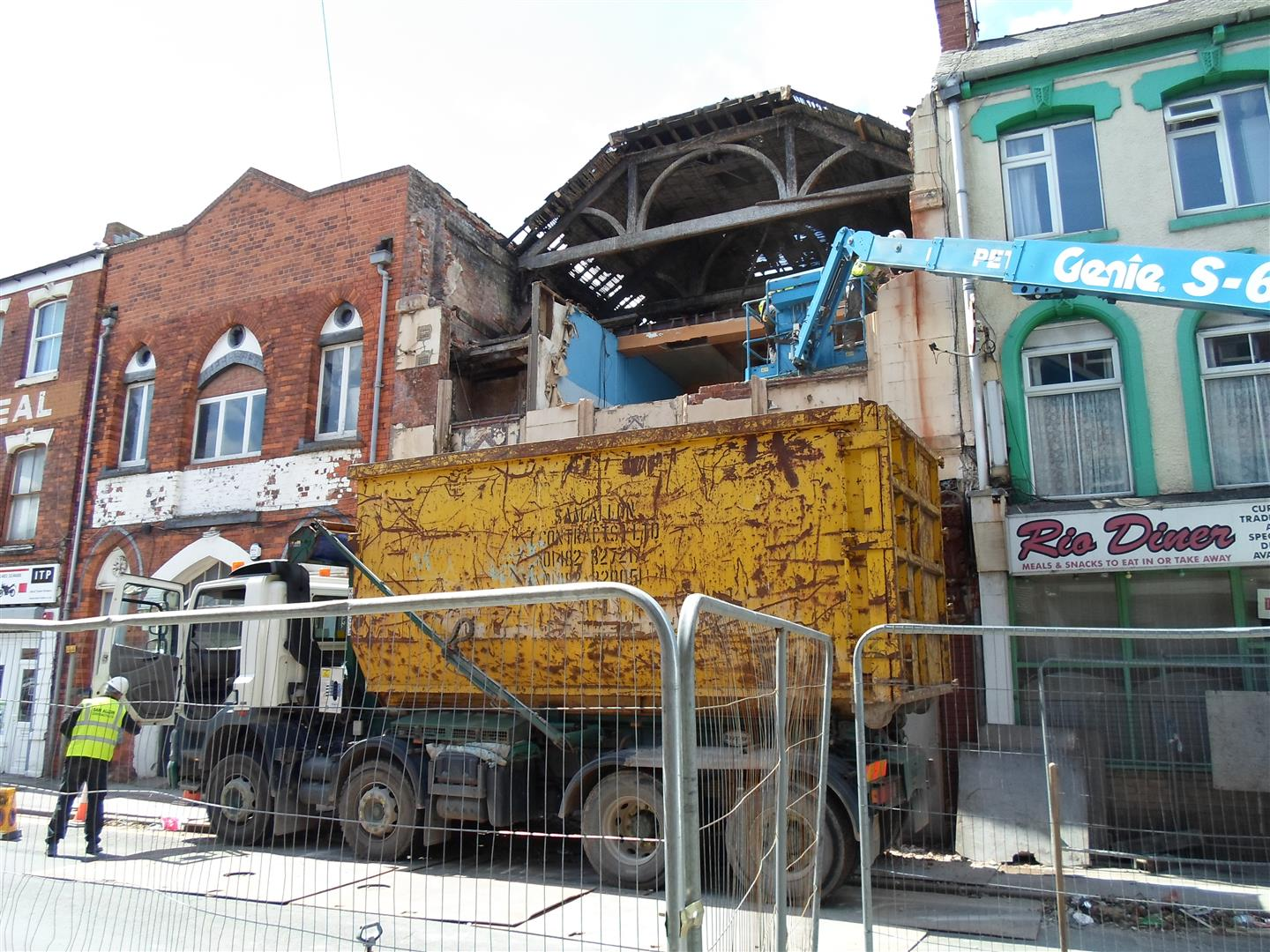
Demolition of the Albert Hall, Midland Street, Hull - 3 June 2015

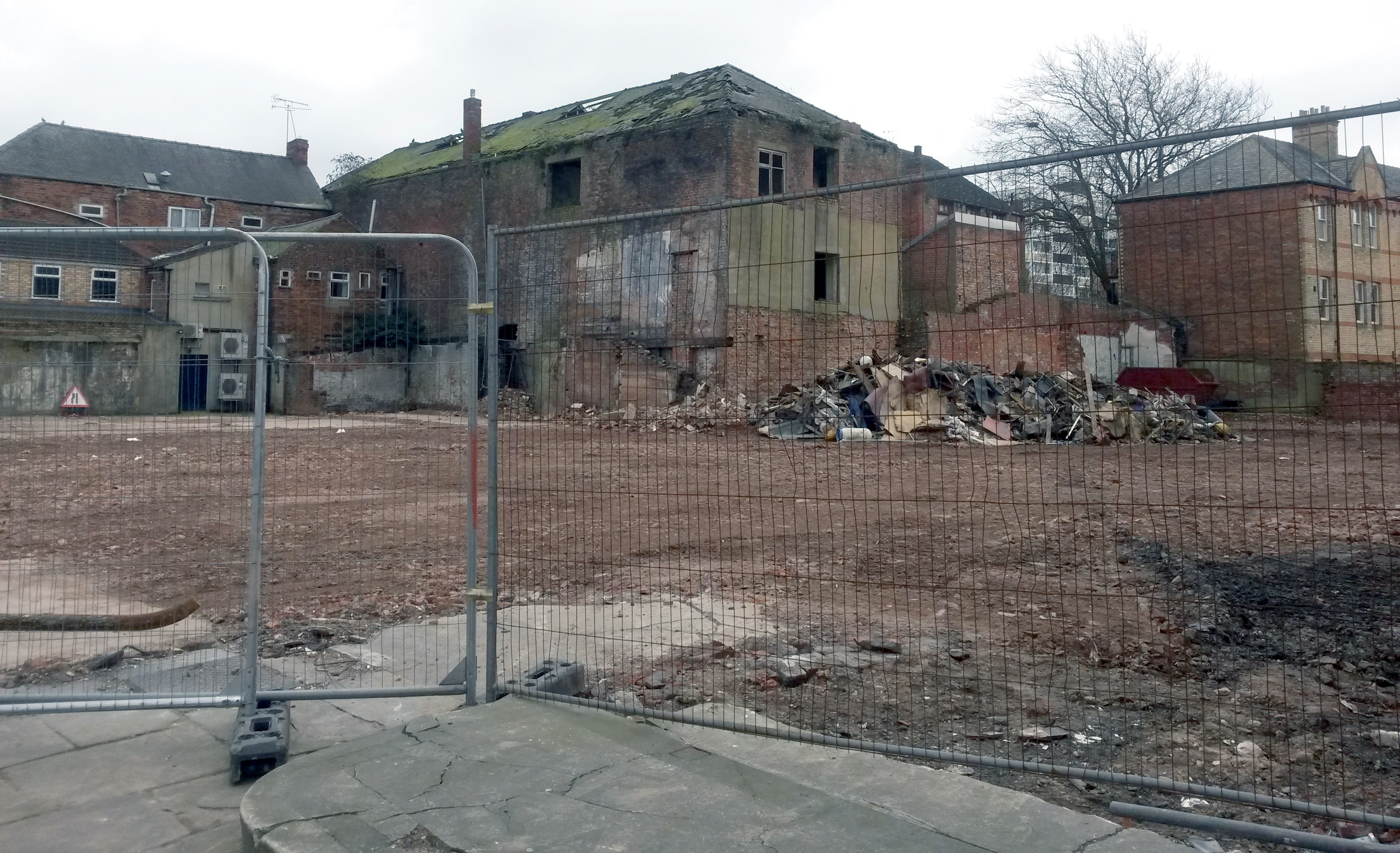
Rear of the Albert Hall Music Hall, following the demolition of the New York Hotel - March 2016

After being disused for more than thirty years, the building had become rather dilapidated and questions about its safety began to be raised. Planning permission was submitted in October 2005 for the erection of a 116 bedroom hotel with conference rooms, coffee lounge, restaurant, bar areas, external courtyard and 48 space basement car park. This expired in 2010 with no apparent work being carried out. In July 2013, safety concerns were raised about the building's structure and a fence was subsequently placed around it to protect the public. In June 2015, part of the building's frontage was demolished after it was discovered to be dangerously unsafe. This was after a fire at a neighbouring building, The New York Hotel at 51 to 59 Anlaby Road, which happens to back onto Midland Street. This building is also derelict and following concerns of its unsightliness and safety, it was also due to be demolished. By March 2016, the building had been demolished, exposing the previously unseen rear of the Albert Hall music hall. In August 2016, work had begun to demolish the rest of the building.
