= Bob Hall (American political journalist) =

American political activist

Bob Hall was the executive director of Democracy North Carolina.

== Career ==
Since the 1960s, Bob Hall has worked with grassroots groups across the Southern United States as an organizer, researcher, investigative reporter, coalition leader and nonprofit executive director. He has worked on a variety of the topics, from labor rights to environmental justice to voting rights and campaign finance reform. Hall was the founding editor of Southern Exposure, the award-winning journal of the Institute for Southern Studies, where he worked for 25 years. He received a MacArthur Foundation “genius award” for using strategic research to help miners, textile workers, poultry growers, utility customers and others “negotiate with corporations.” He has also published books and articles on contemporary Southern politics and culture.

In the 1990s, he co-founded what became Democracy North Carolina and served as its executive director until 2018. Through a combination of research, organizing, and lobbying, Democracy NC-led coalitions won major campaign finance and ethics reforms, including the nation's first full public-financing program for judicial elections. Democracy NC-led coalitions also won same-day registration and voting, expanded early voting (including Sunday “Souls to the Polls”), pre-registration for teenagers, and other changes that elevated North Carolina's ranking from the bottom 12 states for voter participation throughout the twentieth century to the top 12 in recent presidential elections. Opponents of the changes accused Hall of being “someone who truly does have undue and hidden influence on elections in North Carolina.” Hall also authored reports about campaign-finance abuses and filed numerous complaints leading to fines and criminal charges against Democratic and Republican politicians and donors.

== Personal ==
Born in 1944, Hall grew up and attended public schools in Washington, DC, and Orlando, Florida. He graduated from Rhodes College (then Southwestern at Memphis) and obtained his Master of Arts (Sociology and Religion) degree from Columbia University. Both his grandfathers were missionaries, and his mother was a church secretary and choir soloist. He became involved in the Civil Rights Movement in the 1960s and began his career in nonprofit social change as an organizer with the national church-sponsored Mobile Resource Team in 1968. He served on the founding boards of the Fund for Southern Communities, National Institute on Money in Politics, NC Coastal Federation, Southerners for Economic Justice, North Carolinians Against Racist & Religious Violence, and NC Voters for Clean Elections; and he has provided expert testimony in court cases and consulted with officials in a dozen states on voting rights. He is married to Jennifer E. Miller, a landscape painter; their daughter, Cecelia J. Hall, is an opera singer.

== Honors and awards ==
Hall has won a number of awards, including:

- MacArthur Fellows Program award, 1992
- North Carolina Press Association's First Amendment Award
- North Carolina AARP's Advocacy Friend of the Year Award
- North Carolina NAACP's Political Trailblazer Award
- North Carolina ACLU's Frank Porter Graham Award
- North Carolina Governor's Order of the Long Leaf Pine
