= The Cage =

The Cage may refer to:

== Sports ==
- West Fourth Street Courts, also known as "The Cage", as of 1978, a public venue for amateur basketball in New York City
- Al-Shorta Stadium (1990), 1990–2014, former football stadium of Al-Shorta SC, nicknamed "The Cage"
- Riccardo Silva Stadium, built 1995, Florida International University, nicknamed "The Cage"

== Literature ==
- The Cage (French: La cage; pièce en un acte.), a 1898 French play by Lucien Descaves
- The Cage, a 1907 novel by Charlotte Teller
- The Cage, a 1911 novel by Harold Begbie
- The Cage, a 1914 narrative poem by Arturo M. Giovannitti
- "The Cage", a short story by J. D. Beresford, featured in the 1921 collection Signs and Wonders
- The Cage (novel), a 1953 novel by Sydney Horler
- "The Cage" (Chandler story), a 1957 short story by A. Bertram Chandler
- "The Cage", a 1959 short story by Ray Russell
- "The Cage", a 1960 short story by Bryce Walton
- "The Cage", a 1961 short story by Miriam Allen deFord
- The Cage, a 1962 novel by Thomas Hinde
- "The Cage", a 1966 short story by Eileen Gunn
- The Cage, a 1966 novel by Andrea Newman
- The Cage, a 1977 novel by Reg Gadney
- "The Cage", a short story by Damon Knight, featured in the 1985 collection Late Knight Edition
- The Cage: A Holocaust Memoir, a 1986 Holocaust memoir by Ruth Minsky Sender
- The Cage, a 1989 novel by S. M. Stirling and Shirley Meier; the third volume in the Fifth Millennium series
- The Cage, a 1994 novel by Audrey Schulman
- The Cage, a novelette by Ed Gorman, featured in the 1998 collection Midnight Louie's Pet Detectives edited by Carole Nelson Douglas
- The Cage (Abraham book), a 2002 Vietnam War memoir by Tom Abraham
- The Cage, a 2010 novella by A. M. Dellamonica
- The Cage, a 2010 novella by Brian Keene
- The Cage (Weiss book), a 2011 book about the final stages of the Sri Lankan Civil War by Gordon Weiss

== Film, television and radio ==
- The Cage, a 1947 American film directed by Sidney Peterson
- The Cage (1963 film), a 1963 French film
- "The Cage" (Star Trek: The Original Series), the 1965 pilot episode of Star Trek: The Original Series
- The Cage, a 1975 French film directed by Pierre Granier-Deferre
- The Cage (radio show), a 2002–2007 Australian breakfast program
- The Cage (2017 film), a 2017 Bangladeshi film
- The Cage, a 2018 Korean-Taiwanese film directed by Lior Shamriz
- The Cage, a 2019 Czech television film directed by Jiří Strach
- The Cage, a 2024 French television series directed by Franck Gastambide
- The Cage (TV series), British five-part crime thriller

=== Television episodes ===
- "The Cage", 18 Wheels of Justice season 2, episode 16 (2001)
- "The Cage", Baywatch season 11, episode 8 (2000)
- "The Cage", Dr. Simon Locke season 1, episode 8 (1971)
- "The Cage", Foyle's War series 7, episode 2 (2013)
- "The Cage", Friday Night Dinner series 6, episode 5 (2020)
- "The Cage", Gargoyles season 2, episode 20 (1995)
- "The Cage", Gunsmoke season 15, episode 26 (1970)
- "The Cage", Homicide Hunter season 8, episode 6 (2018)
- "The Cage", Roar (1997) episode 12 (2000)
- "The Cage", Strange Empire episode 10 (2015)
- "The Cage", Switch (American) season 3, episode 13 (1978)
- "The Cage", The Amazing World of Gumball season 6, episode 8 (2018)
- "The Cage", The Danny Thomas Hour episode 15 (1968)
- "The Cage", The Fugitive (1963) season 2, episode 10 (1963)
- "The Cage", The Killing season 1, episode 2 (2011)
- "The Cage", The Traitors Canada season 2, episode 6 (2024)

== Music ==
- "The Cage", a 1906 art song by Charles Ives
- The Cage (ballet), a 1951 ballet by Jerome Robbins

=== Albums ===
- The Cage (Tygers of Pan Tang album), 1982
- The Cage (Tony Martin and Dario Mollo album), 1999

=== Songs ===
- "The Cage", a song by Elton John, from Elton John, 1970
- "The Cage", a song by Oasis from Heathen Chemistry, 2002
- "The Cage", a song by Sonata Arctica from Winterheart's Guild, 2003
- "The Cage", a song by Death Grips from The Money Store, 2012
- "The Cage", a song by Tremonti from Dust, 2016

== Other ==
- The Cage (Richmond, Virginia), a city jail in the United States

== See also ==
- Cage (disambiguation)
- La Cage (disambiguation)
- The Gilded Cage (disambiguation)
- The Glass Cage (disambiguation)
- The Golden Cage (disambiguation)
