= Republican Party efforts to disrupt the 2024 United States presidential election =

During the 2024 United States presidential election, the Republican Party attempted to stunt voter access, election oversight, and post-election certification. They also attempted to use strategies to modify voting laws and to place partisan figures in Republican-led states in order to restrict demographics more likely to vote Democratic. These efforts have been promoted using alarmist claims about election integrity, many of which trace back to the election denial movement in the United States.

Numerous court cases challenged the voting process and aimed to set precedents for handling election disputes. Proponents contend that these measures ensure election security; critics argue they erode public trust in election fairness and undermine the democratic process.

== Background ==
Republicans have a history of voter intimidation, disinformation, and dark money influence during presidential elections, with incidents ranging from the possible sabotage of Vietnam War peace talks in 1968 to the swiftboating of John Kerry in 2004, notwithstanding the 2000 Volusia error. The Republican Party belongs to the International Democracy Union (IDU), a global group "dedicated to providing mutual support to center-right, establishment parties around the world". Its assistant chairman, Mike Roman, was indicted in Georgia for conspiring to steal the U.S. 2020 election.

=== Grievances ===
For decades, Republicans sought evidence of electoral fraud; multiple mainstream media experts found that such fraud is very rare. Heritage claimed to have found more than 1,500 instances of fraud over 42 years (a relatively negligible amount); an analysis led by the Brennan Center for Justice assessed that Heritage's findings were an exaggeration and that there were far fewer instances of voter fraud in that 42 year interval. In April 2024, according to the Associated Press, there was not even one single instance of voting by a noncitizen.

After his 2016 win, Trump blamed undocumented migrants for losing the popular vote. In 2017, he established a Presidential Advisory Commission on Election Integrity to investigate voter fraud, improper registration, and voter suppression; it was disbanded a year later, with Matthew Dunlap writing to Mike Pence and Kris Kobach that the commission found nothing substantial.

In July 2017 and August 2018, critics at the Washington Post and CNN alleged that the commission was intended to disenfranchise or deter legal voters and found no evidence of widespread voter fraud, respectively. Kobach has a history of making false or unsubstantiated allegations of voting fraud to advocate for voting restrictions.

After his 2020 loss, Trump alleged that the election had been rigged, a narrative known as his big lie. A movement emerged to advance this narrative, with right-wing media promoting fraud allegations, including conspiracy theories that voting machines had been rigged. In response, Dominion and Smartmatic filed defamation lawsuits; Fox News agreed to settle for $787.5 million after it was revealed that top on-air personalities and executives knew they promoted baseless allegations. In 2000 Mules, Dinesh D'Souza accused Democratic operatives of ballot collecting across five swing states during the 2020 election; he apologized for his allegations in 2024.

=== Money ===
Between 2020 and 2022, over 3,500 foundations and high net-worth donors provided over $1 billion to about 150 nonprofit organizations that supported voter suppression activities. By 2023, organizations funded by dark money had met quietly with officials in Republican-controlled states to create and foster policies that would restrict ballot access and amplify false claims that fraud is rampant in elections.

Elon Musk contributed at least $260 million to efforts to re-elect Trump; he also funded Building America's Future since 2022, and has also given money to Citizens for Sanity through that network. Building America's Future also funded the Fair Election Fund, which paid $75,000 in bounties for alleged election fraud claims and promised to publicize them.

=== Purges ===
Paul Weyrich justified vote restriction in a 1980 speech: "our leverage in the elections quite candidly goes up as the voting populace goes down". The Brennan Center determined that nearly 16 million voters were removed by states between 2014 and 2016. Crosscheck has been criticized by journalists and researchers for poor accuracy. Greg Palast estimated that 1.1 million voters were removed from voter rolls by the 2016 election, overly purging voters of color. Following Trump's 2020 loss, Republican lawmakers initiated a sweeping effort to make voting laws more restrictive in several states and to take control of the administrative management of elections at the state and local level.

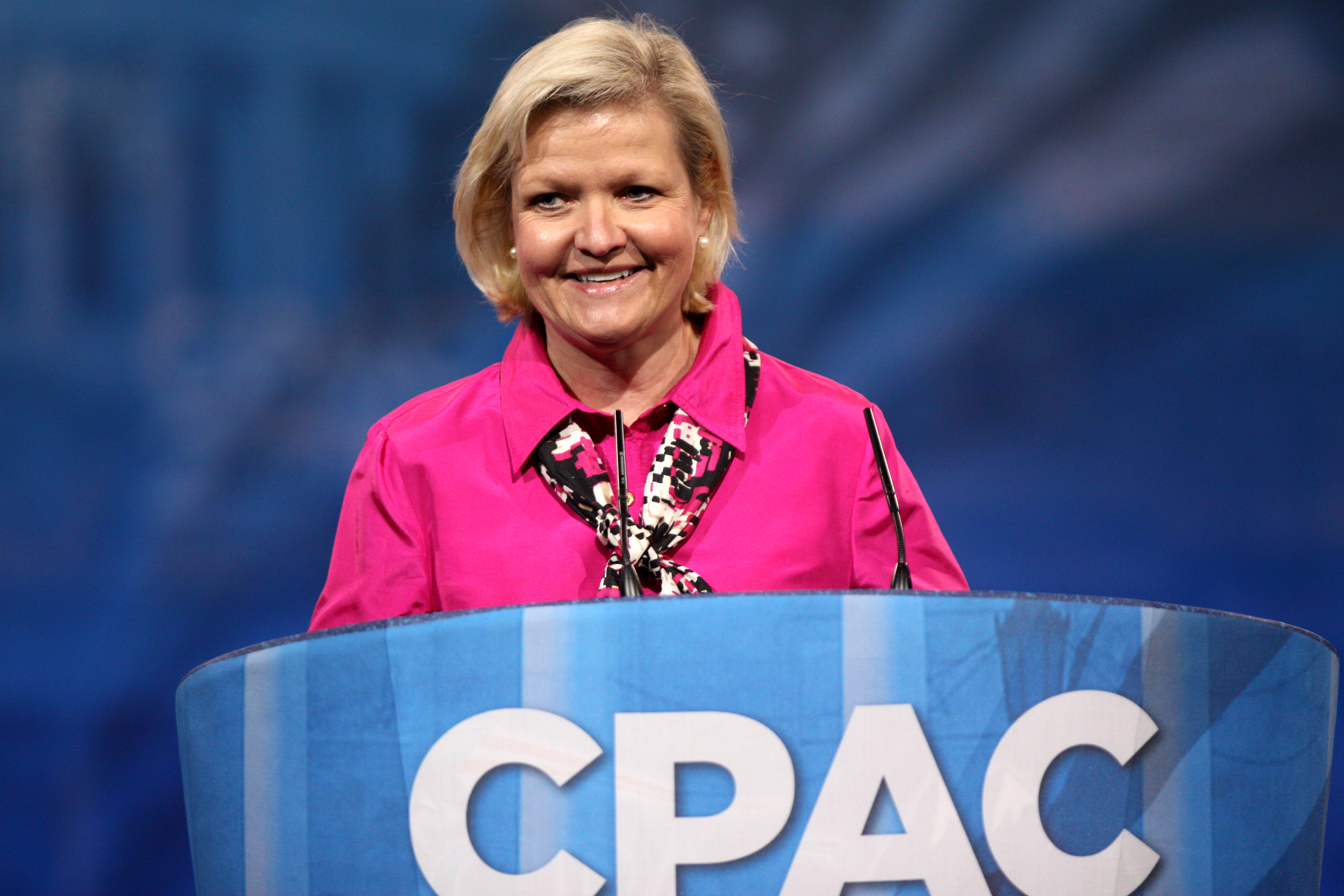
Cleta Mitchell speaking at the 2013 Conservative Political Action Conference

By 2021, GOP election activists prioritized "radical incrementalism", suggesting step-by-step legislative revisions instead of seeking broad policy changes. Cleta Mitchell, who participated in the Trump–Raffensperger phone call to change the certified 2020 Georgia election, launched in 2021 the Election Integrity Network (EIN) to recruit, train and deploy aggressively observant poll watchers in key states. The Election Integrity Act of 2021 in Georgia (SB 202) allows people to file an unlimited number of challenges to voter registrations in the state; Brad Raffensperger said that challenges ensured voter integrity. Bee Nguyen said SB 202 bypassed the National Voter Registration Act of 1993; it could also violate the Civil Rights Act and Ku Klux Klan Act. By November 2022, almost 150,000 challenges had been filed, primarily against young or Black voters. No charges of fraud were made. EIN collaborated with the Election Transparency Initiative, headed by Ken Cuccinelli.

In 2022 recordings, National Election Integrity director Josh Findlay said that the Republican National Committee (RNC) would support efforts to provide EIN staff, organization, and "muscle" in key states. Zoom meetings showed coordination between the EIN, the RNC, four Republican secretaries of state, and a dozen state legislatures to deploy vigilantes and spread conspiracy theories in right-wing media. In North Carolina, Republican state legislators passed a law to split the state board of elections and local county boards evenly between the Democratic and Republican parties; Roy Cooper criticized the law for potentially causing stalemates. In Texas, Republican state legislators passed two laws that targeted Harris County.

By September 2021, at least 8,500 vigilantes were recruited but not always screened: some openly supported QAnon, joined January 6, or defended the militia movement. This strategy was used by the RNC to connect new poll workers with local party attorneys. Many have attempted to push out higher-ranking officials who did not. By April 2024, the Republican Party was largely controlled by the election denial movement, with Trump campaign personnel taking leadership roles in the RNC.

=== Hacks ===
Election security experts and journalists have warned about security vulnerabilities and other flaws in the election infrastructure. Three vendors dominate election technology in the United States, limiting the ability for election officials to replace an existing system.

At an August 2021 event organized by Mike Lindell, copies of software from Dominion Voting Systems equipment in Colorado and Michigan were distributed and posted to the public Internet. Lindell stated that his goal is to remove voting machines entirely and switch to paper ballots, a process that election officials warned would be tedious, time-consuming and prone to errors. Electronic pollbooks, ballot scanners, servers for vote counting, USB flash drives, and memory cards were also copied in Coffee County, Georgia. Voting experts expressed alarm over the breaches due to their breaking of the chain of custody over ballots and tabulators; as well as invasion of voter privacy. In December 2022, election experts sent a letter to the United States Department of Justice that described a "multi-state conspiracy to copy voting software" that was at least partially funded by Trump supporters and asked for a federal investigation.

In August 2023, Matthew DePerno, the former Republican nominee for the 2022 Michigan Attorney General election, and former Republican state representative Daire Rendon were charged with "undue possession of a voting machine, willfully damaging a voting machine and conspiracy". DePerno spread false claims about the 2020 United States presidential election. In December 2023, a follow-up open letter from computer scientists, election security experts and voter advocacy organizations listed repeated attempts by allies of Trump to access voting system software in Georgia, Michigan, Pennsylvania, Ohio, Nevada and Colorado, again calling for a federal investigation, noting that the software is used nationwide.

The America Project, founded in 2021 by Michael Flynn and Patrick Byrne, said it would roll out "state-of-the-art election tools" that would include artificial intelligence. CNN reported that Flynn expressed a goal to "fundamentally change the way votes are counted at the state level" in text messages to Doug Logan, the CEO of Cyber Ninjas, which conducted the 2021 Maricopa County presidential ballot audit.

The America Project is staffed by prominent election deniers and funds another project, One More Mission, that seeks to recruit tens of thousands of people with military and law enforcement experience to monitor polling places. The Intercept reported in April 2020 that during a February strategy session attended by conservative donors and activists, Englebrecht said that "you get some SEALs in those polls and they're going to say, 'No, no, this is what it says. This is how we're going to play this show.' That's what we need. We need people who are unafraid to call it like they see it." Several attendees specifically cited this need for "inner city" and predominantly Native American polling precincts.

=== Backsliding ===
In 2018, David Frum said the Republican platform "can't prevail in democratic competition". He also wrote that "if conservatives become convinced that they cannot win democratically, they will not abandon conservatism. They will reject democracy."

Between 2021 and 2024, Trump, high-profile right-wing figures, supporters, and media outlets have been accused of promoting conspiracy theories, lies, dehumanization, demonization of political opponents, threats of violence, as well as forms of stochastic terrorism. Mike Pompeo endorsed violent PAC recruitment ads; Paul Gosar released a viral video glorifying a death threat.

The Atlantic argues that white flight in the 1960s and 1970s as well as the rise of white suburban evangelicals were both crucial to these activities. Republican Bob Inglis and journalist David Corn have compared the resulting electoral system to "apartheid".

As part of one of the 2022 break-out sessions, the Dallas CPAC conference displayed a banner across their main stage with the phrase "We are all domestic terrorists." Solomon Peña was convicted for the 2022-2023 shootings at the homes of four Arizona Democratic officials, including the state House speaker.

Journalists and political science experts have accused Republicans of displaying anti-democratic attitudes and behaviors.

In the 2020 cycle, Republicans have stopped many voting rights legislations using filibuster; Sen. Kyrsten Sinema (D-AZ) and Sen. Joe Manchin (D-WV) have allowed it to happen.

Commentators have framed the party's actions in the context of supporting minority rule for itself. Examples include reapportioning House of Representatives districts to exclude undocumented immigrants and anyone under the age of 18, attempts to overturn the 2020 United States presidential election, gerrymandering (particularly redistricting by Republicans in 2000 and then in 2010 with the REDMAP project that was proposed by Karl Rove and led by Ed Gillespie), voter suppression laws, politicization of election boards, attempts by Republican-controlled state legislatures to remove powers from then-recently elected Democratic governors, Citizens United v. FEC, and Shelby County v. Holder.

Multiple commentators, journalists, and politicians have further accused the Republican Party of embracing fascism, as exemplified by its ties to paramilitary groups and white nationalism, support for voter suppression, alliances with European nationalist parties, use of fascist language and imagery, and violent threats.

In 2021, Republican legislators in Texas and Florida passed laws to limit the ability of social media organizations to moderate content on their own platforms. These laws were supported by Republican attorneys general from 19 states. Republican-introduced bills in many states allowed for civil lawsuits against social media companies over perceived "censorship" of posts, especially those related to politics or religion. As of March 2021, research has not supported the allegation that social media companies are biased against conservative viewpoints.

In 2022, under pressure from Republican politicians and right-wing activists, the United States Department of Homeland Security shut down the Disinformation Governance Board and canceled a project with a non-profit to track death threats targeting election workers.

In 2024, the Washington State Republican Party passed a resolution that stated its opposition to legislation making the country "more democratic in nature."

=== Pranks ===
During the 2020 elections, Jacob Wohl and Jack Burkman have sent robocall messages targeting Black voters in Michigan, New York, and Ohio.

== Activities ==
The New York Times reported in July 2024 that "the Republican Party and its conservative allies are engaged in an unprecedented legal campaign targeting the American voting system" by systematically searching for vulnerabilities. The effort involves a network of powerful Republican lawyers and activists, many of whom were involved in the attempts to overturn the 2020 presidential election. It involves restricting voting and short-circuiting the certification process should Trump lose. The Republican strategy involved first persuading voters that the election is about to be stolen by Democrats, despite lacking evidence. After the election, if Trump were to lose, lawyers would attempt to challenge decades of settled law as to how elections are certified. The New York Times reported the efforts had "been quietly playing out in courts, statehouses and county boards for months, and is concentrated in critical battlegrounds". In October 2024, The Washington Post identified as vulnerabilities leading to a possible attempt at overturning the election's results the following: widespread false information, weeks-long recounts, lawsuits delaying final results, breakdown in certifying results, disruptions at elector meetings, Congress stalling the certification, and a wild card ("something new could be tried that attorneys and election officials haven't yet gamed out"). The Pennsylvania Department of State described these voter registration challenges as "an attempt to circumvent the list maintenance processes that are carefully prescribed by state and federal law," which would result in "disenfranchisement, unnecessary litigation, and a harassing diversion of already-stretched county resources."

=== Speeches ===
During the 2024 campaign, Trump often referred to "election integrity" to allude to his continuing claim that the 2020 election was rigged, as well as predictions of future mass election fraud. As he did during the 2020 election cycle, Trump claimed that Democrats would try to rig the 2024 election. Many Republicans reported to believe that Democratic Party have and continue to engage in systemic election fraud, with some being concerned regarding election integrity. By 2022, Republican politicians and conservative talk radio cable news outlets echoed the statement of former Trump advisor Steve Bannon that Democrats can only win if they cheat.

During town hall events in October, Musk spread false conspiracy theories about voting machines, linking voting machines from Dominion to election losses for the Republican Party. He advocated for elections to be run with only hand-counted paper ballots, and for only in-person voting with identification, despite America PAC supporting mail-in voting and absentee ballots.

At a rally on November 5, 2024, Donald Trump stated: "[Musk] really is watching this whole voting process. ... He looked at some that were just shipped in, some of these vote-counting computers. He knew it before it even came in the door. He looked like at the back of it, 'Oh, I know that one.' He knows this stuff better than anyone."

On at least five occasions during the election cycle, Trump has told his supporters that "we don't need the votes." MSNBC argued that Trump was pushing for voter intimidation to handle false claims of electoral fraud on behalf of his political opponents.

=== Socials ===
The National Fraternal Order of Police, representing some 375,000 police officers nationwide, endorsed Trump in September 2024. Addressing the group's board, he urged officers to "watch for voter fraud" because "you can keep it down just by watching, because, believe it or not, they're afraid of that badge." Such police activity might violate multiple state laws and raise concerns of voter intimidation. The next day, Trump posted on social media that, if he were to win, "those involved in unscrupulous behavior will be sought out, caught, and prosecuted at levels, unfortunately, never seen before in our Country."

Elon Musk, owner of X, has used his account with 197 million followers to post false or misleading information about the election, notably the Great Replacement conspiracy theory, contending Democrats are intentionally "importing" undocumented migrants to vote. In one case, Musk reposted a false claim that as many as two million noncitizens had been registered to vote in three states. Analysis by the Center for Countering Digital Hate found that during the first seven months of 2024, fifty false or misleading Musk posts about the election generated 1.2 billion views; independent fact-checkers debunked the posts, though the Community Notes user-generated fact check feature on X did not note them. Musk endorsed Trump in July 2024.

During the 2024 election, X (formerly Twitter) released "Election Integrity Community", a social media feed run by America PAC that promotes posts that are alleged to support claims by users of voter fraud, "regardless of their accuracy." X/Twitter under Musk had previously softened its civic integrity policy, laying off trust and safety staff, platform manipulation and disinformation. Claims of election fraud had spread on X/Twitter with little moderation. The Center for Countering Digital Hate reported in November 2024 that false or misleading claims about the election had 2 billion views on X/Twitter in 2024 (promoted by Musk himself in at least 87 posts).

In July 2024, Jerry Nadler wrote a letter to the House Judiciary Committee asking for an investigation into whether X/Twitter had limited users from following Kamala Harris' official presidential campaign account, with Nadler and NBC News noting that at least 16 accounts had posted that they were unable to follow the account.

Academic researchers had found that, shortly after Musk tweeted his endorsement of Trump in July 2024, Musk's X/Twitter account had received a strong and sustained increase in engagement compared to other high-profile political accounts; and that right-wing accounts had higher post visibility compared to left-wing accounts during the same time period. An analysis from the Washington Post also found that, between July 2023 and October 2024, tweets from Republican politicians had significantly more virality compared to those from Democrats.

=== Websites ===
Several Republican members have been tied to fake news websites that firehose misinformation during the campaign about:

- the hurricane season
- the Springfield pet-eating hoax
- the 2024 United States elections
- abortion
- vaccines
- LGBTQ
- pasteurization
- climate change

Techniques include AI slop and Russian propaganda. The Center for Countering Hate has identified ten fringe publishers, many of which are connected to Robert Mercer.

Some of these websites had lost advertisers in response to boycotts or were banned from being shared on some social media platforms, reducing their web traffic. Conservative figures were deplatformed from social media for incitement of violence or hate speech.

To sow election doubt, Trump escalated use of "rigged election" and "election interference" statements in advance of the 2024 election compared to the previous two elections—the statements described as part of a "heads I win; tails you cheated" rhetorical strategy.

==== Biden putsch ====
In July 2024, Mike Powell, the group's executive director for its Oversight Project, said that "as things stand right now, there is a zero percent chance of a free and fair election in the United States of America", adding, "I'm formally accusing the Biden administration of creating the conditions that most reasonable policymakers and officials cannot in good conscience certify an election." Heritage released a report predicting without supporting evidence that Biden might try to retain power "by force" if he were to lose in November. Election law expert Rick Hasen remarked that "this is gaslighting and it is dangerous in fanning flames that could lead to potential violence."

==== Nonvoting citizens registrations ====
The Heritage Oversight Project produced videos for distribution on social media and conservative media outlets that made false or misleading claims about the extent of noncitizen voting registrations. In one video that was sent viral by an Elon Musk repost, Heritage falsely claimed that 14% of noncitizens in Georgia were registered, concluding that "the integrity of the 2024 election is in great jeopardy". Heritage based their findings on an extrapolation of hidden camera interview responses from seven residents in a Norcross, Georgia, apartment complex. State investigators found the seven people had never registered. During the closing weeks of the campaign, Trump's campaign and its allies revived allegations from 2020 that voting machines were rigged. The claims were widespread on social media and were frequently mentioned in lawsuits filed by Republicans. Trump and Musk repeated baseless claims of fraud and "cheating" in Bucks County, Pennsylvania, in the days before Election Day.

==== Legitimacy of Kamala Harris ====
Trump repeatedly questioned the legitimacy of his opponent, Kamala Harris, in the 2024 election by falsely claiming she orchestrated a "coup" against Biden in what The Washington Post described as an attempt to delegitimize Harris if she wins and undermine confidence in the result of the 2024 election. It further noted Trump's long insistence that "his political failures are the result of some malevolent force trying to keep him out of power", echoing right-wing conspiracy theories and rhetoric about a deep state in the United States.

==== Blue shift ====
Trump pointed to the known voting phenomenon known as a "blue shift" or "red mirage" to make baseless allegations of voting fraud. Trump frequently made unfounded claims that he is ahead in the polls and winning in deep blue states, alleging the only reason he loses such states is because of voter fraud. By October 2024, Trump made several rallies in blue states, and CNN reported that Trump believes holding rallies in blue states helps "show how deep his support runs across the nation" and also "set the groundwork for Trump to question the election results should Harris win".

In October 2024, The New York Times reported on a number of polls commissioned by right-wing firms, most showing a Trump victory and standing out "amid the hundreds of others indicating a dead heat in the presidential election" and that they were seen as "building a narrative of unstoppable momentum for Mr. Trump". It further said that the polls were "cementing the idea that the only way Mr. Trump can lose to Vice President Kamala Harris is if the election is rigged" and that they "could be held up as evidence of cheating if that victory does not come to pass". The report noted that by October 2020, Republican-aligned pollsters had only released 15 presidential polls in swing states compared to 37 in 2024, and that of the 37 all but seven had Trump in the lead. Several of the polls were also accepted in influencing the polling averages by RealClearPolitics, which were widely shared among Republican circles. The New York Times also reported on betting markets Polymarket and Kalshi as strongly favoring Trump over Harris, and that part of the surge appeared in part due to a small number of individuals betting $30 million on a Trump win, and that Trump and Musk had pointed to the betting markets as evidence of their strength. Other data were also "cited by Trump supporters as further evidence of his impending triumph".

Joshua Dyck of the Center for Public Opinion at the University of Massachusetts Lowell said that "Republicans are clearly strategically putting polling into the information environment to try to create perceptions that Trump is stronger." The increase in partisan polls were criticized by Simon Rosenberg, who alleged that Republicans were "flooding the zone" to shift polling averages, create media buzz and deflate Democratic enthusiasm. G. Elliott Morris of FiveThirtyEight stated that such low-quality polls would not impact their polling averages, which are weighted by the quality and reputation of the pollster, as did Nate Cohn of The New York Times, who calculated only a small shift in the averages. Polling strategists for both parties criticized seeing the use of polling "weaponized" to decrease faith in the entire system. Republican strategist Mike Madrid stated that "the main reason you float data like that is because you're trying to convince your supporters there's no way Trump can lose — unless it's stolen".

==== Noncitizens voting ====
Trump and many of his allies alleged the Biden administration was intentionally welcoming migrants into the country so they could register and vote for Democratic candidates. Many volunteers repeated rumors and conspiracies that NGOs aligned with Democrats were registering migrants to vote. Fox News host Maria Bartiromo told her X (formerly Twitter) followers that a friend of a friend told her they had seen tables set up outside Texas DMV offices to register migrants, though a Texas Department of Public Safety spokesman said "none of it is true". Texas attorney general Ken Paxton and activists advanced these false narratives. Michael Waldman, president of the Brennan Center, said during an August congressional hearing that he believed the false narratives were created "to set the stage for undermining the legitimacy of the 2024 election this year. The Big Lie is being pre-deployed." Lies about noncitizen voting have become the main focus of election denialism ahead of the 2024 election, which some experts say have been used to intimidate and suppress voters while laying the groundwork to try and overturn the election again, should Trump lose.

The New York Times reported in September 2024 that "the notion that [noncitizens] will flood the polls — and vote overwhelmingly for Democrats — is animating a sprawling network of Republicans who mobilized around" Trump after he claimed the 2020 election was rigged, and "the false theories about widespread noncitizen voting could be used to dispute the outcome again." The Heritage Foundation was particularly instrumental in spreading the false narrative. Appearing with Trump in April 2024, House speaker Mike Johnson baselessly suggested "potentially hundreds of thousands of votes" might be cast by undocumented migrants; as president, Trump falsely asserted that millions of votes cast by undocumented migrants had deprived him of a popular vote victory in the 2016 election. States have found very few noncitizens on their voting rolls, and in the extremely rare instances of votes cast by noncitizens, they are legal immigrants who are often mistaken that they have a right to vote. An April 2024, Cato Institute reviewed Heritage's election fraud database found 85 irregularities involving noncitizens over the preceding 22 years.

==== Indictments ====
By April 2024, dozens of Republicans in four states have been indicted for their involvement in promoting conspiracies, such as the fake electors or the Pence card plots. Those indicted included Trump and Christina Bobb, who led the Republican National Committee election integrity legal efforts in the 2024 presidential election. In September, Hanna Rosin described how January 6 insurrectionists have created "a new mythology on the right". The Justice Department planned to monitor compliance with voting rights laws on Election Day in 27 states. Claims by Trump and Republican allies of election fraud persisted up to Election Day on November 5. After Trump was declared the winner, these claims had largely stopped, with his "election integrity" allies crediting his victory to their efforts.

=== Phone calls ===
Voter intimidation can be conveyed through text, robocall, AI-generated voice.

=== Exploits ===
==== Machines ====
Between at least June and October 2024, partial passwords for election machines were exposed in a hidden tab in a spreadsheet on the Colorado secretary of state's website. According to the secretary of state's office, the machines are still protected by requiring two distinct passwords for each system, which are stored separately, by not connecting the machines to the Internet, and by storing the machines in rooms that can only be accessed with ID badges and are continuously monitored by video cameras. An investigation by a law firm concluded that the hidden tab was created by an employee who worked in the office between 2020 and 2023. A second employee, who, according to the office, was unaware of the hidden tab, posted the spreadsheet online. As a witness in a lawsuit by the Libertarian Party of Colorado, a co-founder of election vigilante group U.S. Election Integrity Plan testified that he had viewed the hidden tab three times between August and October 2024, before the state was aware of the breach.

In October 2024, Jocelyn Benson announced that voter access terminals (VAT) from Dominion, which assist persons with disabilities with ballot marking, had an issue with split ticket votes. She said that this issue affected Dominion machines nationwide.

The Voting Machine Hacking Village (a hacking event co-founded by Harri Hursti) at DEF CON 32 in 2024 discovered "new vulnerabilities ... in several widely-fielded ballot-marking and DRE voting machines." Due to the complexities of upgrading election equipment, election and cybersecurity experts found it unlikely that vulnerability findings from the conference would have been fixed prior to Election Day.

Election deniers had spread a password that they alleged to be used in Dominion voting machines in Georgia, some wearing it on t-shirts.

==== Electronic pollbooks ====
Journalists have noted security vulnerabilities with electronic pollbooks (e-pollbooks) in the lead-up to the 2024 election the lack of national standards for security and reliability, the lack of a system that tracks incidents with e-pollbooks, past efforts by hackers from Russia and Iran to obtain voter data, and the subsequent risk of voters being deleted from the voter rolls by unauthorized users.

They have also been blamed for delays in the voting process. As of 2018, they are used by 36 states. ES&S is one of the main manufacturers of e-pollbooks and they, along with Diebold Election Systems, had lobbied for election officials to use them after the Help America Vote Act was passed in 2002. Free Press reported that some ES&S e-pollbooks could communicate via Bluetooth to voting machines.

==== Mail ====
In July 2024, the USPS inspector general published a report noting that some service workers were not following proper procedures for mail-in ballots in some places, and that some mailed ballots were missing postmarks, which are required in many states. The report further warned that some ballots were at risk of not being counted due to both current USPS policies for processing mail as well as changes by DeJoy's Delivering for America plan. Some changes were made within days of the 2024 primary elections in Georgia and Virginia.

Lawmakers were concerned about plans by the USPS to consolidate regional hubs, arguing that mail delivery would slow down. Significant slowdowns had been observed throughout the United States as of April 2024. Some of these regional hubs were located in states such as Virginia, Oregon, Texas and Missouri as well as swing states Georgia, Nevada, and Wisconsin. These consolidations have been paused until January 2025, following criticism from lawmakers.

In September 2024, the National Association of State Election Directors and National Association of Secretaries of State sent an open letter to DeJoy supporting the inspector general report, warning that the USPS has marked election mail to voters as undeliverable at "higher than usual rates, even in cases where a voter is known not to have moved" and that ballots that were processed in some places arrived at election offices 10+ days after the postmark date. In some states, dozens or hundreds of ballots for 2024 primary elections had arrived over 10 days after being postmarked. Other problems highlighted in the letter include "lost or delayed election mail, and front-line training deficiencies impacting USPS's ability to deliver election mail in a timely and accurate manner". These issues have been described as "systemic". There is the risk that, if mail is returned to the original sender, voters may miss their mail-in ballots or removed from voter registration rolls.

Republicans have filed lawsuits to stop states from counting postmarked mail-in ballots that are received by election officials after Election Day. As of August 2024, these lawsuits have been filed in Nevada, Illinois, North Dakota and Mississippi. Plaintiffs include the Republican National Committee, Mark Splonskowski (the Burleigh County Auditor who is supported by Public Interest Legal Foundation), the Mississippi Republican Party and a county election commissioner.

Several issues were reported with mail-in ballots: some were discarded, stranded or delayed, undated (which were not counted in Pennsylvania following lawsuits by the Republican National Committee, the Pennsylvania Republican Party and David McCormick), stolen or forged, misdirected, unprocessed, and destroyed.

Issues had also occurred with voter registration forms.

==== Third-party ====
Republican activists, lawyers, and operatives have supported third party campaigns, with the stated goal of taking away votes from Kamala Harris.

In an April 5 meeting with New York Republicans, Rita Palma, the Robert F. Kennedy Jr. campaign director for New York, said their top priority was to "get rid of Biden" and prevent a Biden victory by getting Republican voters to vote for Kennedy to defeat their "mutual enemy" by being a spoiler and triggering a contingent election. Plans included collecting signatures for Kennedy, volunteering with the Trump campaign in Pennsylvania, and voting for Kennedy for president.

In September, the Republican-majority North Carolina Supreme Court allowed Kennedy to have his name removed from the ballot in the state after he had suspended his campaign and made the request five days after the deadline. Slate noted that Kennedy had withdrawn his name in swing states in order to help Trump, as polling suggested that Kennedy's campaign would have taken votes from Trump.

=== Lawsuits ===
==== Julie Adams ====
Julie Adams, an EIN regional coordinator, sits on the Fulton County, Georgia, elections board and has promoted the use of EagleAI in Georgia. In May 2024, she abstained from certifying the recent county primary results, though no issues of error or misconduct had been raised. State law says that election boards "shall" certify elections if no problems were identified; the four other board members voted to certify. Adams started a lawsuit, backed by the Trump-aligned America First Policy Institute (AFPI), seeking a court ruling to grant election board members more discretion in certifications. Congresswoman and Georgia Democratic Party chair Nikema Williams alleged that Adams was attempting to set the stage to block certification of results in the November presidential election. Fulton is the most populous county in Georgia with a plurality of Black residents. A Fulton County superior court judge ruled against Adams in October 2024, finding that her actions were unconstitutional and violated state law. The legal arm of AFPI was led by former Florida attorney general and Trump attorney Pam Bondi who filed voting lawsuits in battleground states.

==== Georgia State Election Board ====
According to a September 2024 New York Times newsletter, Georgia seems the most likely state to overturn election results on unfounded claims of fraud in 2024 due to recent changes in who oversees elections. In August 2024, the Georgia State Election Board enacted two new rules that could deputize local election officials more discretion on whether they certify the election, contrary to state and national precedent. The Board also approved a rule in September requiring all counties to hand-count their ballots for comparison to machine counts. Critics think this rule might cause errors and confusion while disrupting the custody of ballots, because ballots typically remain sealed unless a recount is demanded in a challenged election. The recounts could also significantly delay the reporting of election results. On October 16, another Fulton County Superior Court judge found that these new election rules were "illegal, unconstitutional and void", ordering the Board to inform all state and local election officials that the rules were to be disregarded. An appeal of the latter ruling by the RNC was unanimously rejected by the Georgia Supreme Court days later.

==== Georgia Election Integrity Coalition ====
Citizens for Responsibility and Ethics in Washington obtained months of emails among elections officials in at least five Georgia counties calling themselves the Georgia Election Integrity Coalition. The Guardian reported the communications included a "who's who of Georgia election denialists" who were "coordinating on policy and messaging to both call the results of November's election into question before a single vote is cast, and push rules and procedures favored by the election denial movement." Some officials had ties to national groups like Tea Party Patriots and the Election Integrity Network led by Cleta Mitchell. By October 2024, Republicans were filing lawsuits in battleground states alleging potential fraud to challenge mail-in ballots received from American citizens living abroad. They sought to have certain ballots set aside until voter eligibility could be verified. With about 6.5 million eligible American voters living overseas, the overseas vote was long considered sacrosanct by both parties, historically giving Republicans a voting edge but more recently that advantage had diminished or swung to Democrats. Judges in Michigan and North Carolina rejected RNC suits, ruling they were an "attempt to disenfranchise" voters and had "presented no substantial evidence" of fraud. Republican congressman Scott Perry played a key role among Republican House members in efforts to overturn Biden's election in 2020. He and five other Pennsylvania representatives filed suit in their state asserting that verification of overseas ballots was insufficient to protect the election from foreign interference. Perry said he "joined my colleagues to defend our election against the intrusion and interference of the greatest state sponsor of terrorism in the world: Iran." Pennsylvania federal judge Christopher Conner dismissed the suit in October 2024, citing its "phantom fears of foreign malfeasance".

==== Voter registrations ====
In January 2024, two people (one who heads two "election integrity" groups and another who ran as a volunteer for the Anne Arundel County Republican Central Committee in 2022) sued the Maryland State Board of Elections for access to state voter records. They were represented by the group Restoring Integrity and Trust in Elections (RITE), which was founded in 2022 by William Barr, Karl Rove, Steve Wynn, and Bobby Burchfield (a lawyer for the RNC and Trump's 2020 election campaign who represented their efforts to halt mail-in ballots in North Carolina during that election).

In June, Gina Swoboda filed a lawsuit attempting to remove at least 500,000 registered voters from the voting rolls in Arizona. She was joined by Steve Gaynor and Scot Mussi, the president of the Arizona Free Enterprise Club, and had filed a separate lawsuit against the Arizona Secretary of State Adrian Fontes over rules against voter intimidation.

In July, Republicans filed a lawsuit against government officials in Michigan over the state expanding voter registration sites to offices of the Small Business Administration and the United States Department of Veterans Affairs. By July, conservative groups were systematically challenging large numbers of voter registrations across the country. Many of these efforts were driven by lawsuits. The groups' stated rationale was to purge voter rolls of dead people, noncitizens and others ineligible to vote. Several Republican secretaries of state were also examining the rolls themselves. The executive director of the National Association of State Election Directors said many of the challenges ignore or misunderstand the complexity and legal requirements involved in maintaining the rolls. Others said the efforts risked disenfranchising eligible voters and sowing distrust in the election system. The Michigan secretary of state had earlier in the year directed a suburban Detroit clerk to reinstate about 1,000 registrations of eligible voters that had been purged. The New York Times reported "it is difficult to know precisely how many voters have been dropped from the rolls as a result of the campaign — and even harder to determine how many were dropped in error."

In October, the United States Supreme Court upheld the state of Virginia's attempts to purge 1,600 registered voters from the voter rolls. Investigative journalist Greg Palast published to YouTube a documentary, Vigilantes Inc., detailing voter suppression by "vigilante" challenges by self-appointed vote-fraud hunters, not government officials, who are targeting people to challenge and block the counting of their ballots. Many challenges disproportionately impacted Black, young, and unhoused people, as well as students, immigrants, and lower income voters. Some of the vigilante challenge groups, such as Soles to the Rolls in Michigan or the Pigpen Project in Nevada, are connected to Cleta Mitchell, True the Vote, Mike Lindell or EagleAI. The work of these challengers was publicized by conservative websites, who had joined meetings organized by the Election Integrity Network. Several voters were challenged over typos in their addresses. In Michigan, a Republican party official led a "field investigation" by visiting multiple homes to check voter registration. In at least one case, vigilantism over a false claim of voter fraud had led to violence.

Republican politicians have discouraged electronic signatures for voter registration, filed lawsuits to prevent the use of university digital IDs for voting, directed restrictions on ballot drop boxes and proposed eliminating drop boxes altogether. Republicans have also filed lawsuits attempting to limit the right to vote for convicted felons.

==== Signaling refusal of an electoral loss ====
Multiple Republican politicians, including Trump, JD Vance, Lindsey Graham, Ben Carson, Elise Stefanik, Byron Donalds, Tim Scott, Doug Burgum, Marco Rubio, and Ted Cruz, when asked whether they would accept the outcome of the 2024 election, did not give direct answers or refused to accept the results unconditionally, repeating false claims of fraud during the 2020 election.

==== Congressional authorities ====
In August 2024, the RNC, alongside 24 states, sought an emergency Supreme Court ruling that the United States Congress does not have the authority to administer presidential elections. Their goal was to enforce an Arizona state law requiring documented proof of citizenship to vote for president. Robert Bauer warned that such a decision made within a short time before voting started could cause confusion about voting registrations, disrupting the administration of the election. He also warned that, regardless of whether they won or lost, the plaintiffs may have been building a legal case for claims of non-citizen voting after the election. The Supreme Court partially granted the request to enforce that law.

==== Army of poll workers ====
Matt Schlapp, the chairman of the American Conservative Union that hosts the annual Conservative Political Action Conference (CPAC), wrote election officials in at least three swing states in August 2024 to explain plans to monitor ballot drop boxes. Schlapp wrote the monitoring was intended to encourage rather than discourage voting. Election officials dismissed Schlapp's premise; Arizona secretary of state Adrian Fontes remarked, "the whole thing is an absurd sham to cover up direct efforts to intimidate voters by a bunch of CPAC-recruited vigilantes." True the Vote planned to team with sympathetic sheriffs to monitor polling places and drop boxes in Wisconsin. Catherine Engelbrecht said her group was "mainly focused" on Wisconsin but "we do have a scalable program".

Trump's political operation said in April 2024 that it planned to deploy more than 100,000 attorneys and volunteers to polling places across battleground states, with an "election integrity hotline" for poll watchers and voters to report alleged voting irregularities. Trump told a rally audience in December 2023 that they needed to "guard the vote" in Democratic-run cities; at an August 2024 rally, he said he already had enough votes and "our primary focus is not to get out the vote, but to make sure they don't cheat". He had complained that his 2020 campaign was not adequately prepared to challenge his loss in courts; some critics said his 2024 election integrity effort is actually intended to gather allegations to overwhelm the election resolution process should he challenge the 2024 election results. Marc Elias, a Democratic election lawyer who defeated every Trump court challenge after the 2020 election, remarked, "I think they are going to have a massive voter suppression operation and it is going to involve very, very large numbers of people and very, very large numbers of lawyers."

In April 2024, RNC co-chair Lara Trump said the party had the ability to install poll workers who could handle ballots, rather than merely observe polling places. She also said that the 2018 expiration of the 1982 consent decree (Ballot Security Task Force) prohibiting the RNC from intimidation of minority voters "gives us a great ability" in the election. Republicans were recruiting poll watchers in suburbs to deploy in urban areas dominated by Democratic voters. Critics said the RNC plans created a risk that election workers might face harassment and undermine trust in the election process. The Republican governors of several states said that they would not allow the United States Department of Justice Civil Rights Division to send poll monitors to ensure that there are no civil rights violations at polling places.

=== Suppression ===
==== Workers ====
As election workers faced threats and harassment, The Washington Post reported in February 2024 it had interviewed more than a dozen election officials around the country who said they were "preparing for the types of disruptions that historically had been more associated with political unrest abroad than American elections". This included planning to quickly debunk misinformation, deescalate conflicts and improve coordination with federal, state, and local law enforcement to better respond to harassment, threats and potential violence. Fontes said his office was preparing for worst-case scenarios, saying "we recognize the real and present danger that's presented by the conspiracy theories and the lies." A May 2024 poll by Reuters and Ipsos poll found some 68% of Americans — 83% of Democrats and 65% of Republicans — said they were concerned that political violence might follow the election. Olivia Troye, a former Homeland Security and Counterterrorism aide to former vice president Mike Pence, remarked that "the potential for anger, division, political violence — all of that groundwork is being laid out again".

In early November 2024, the secretaries of state for Missouri, Florida, and Texas have stated their intention to block federal election monitors from accessing polling places on Election Day. The United States Department of Justice Civil Rights Division has historically been responsible for enforcing federal voting rights laws, including the Voting Rights Act of 1965 and the Americans with Disabilities Act of 1990.

==== Officers ====
Robert Beadles, an investor of Gab, has supported the precinct strategy who has funded election denialists in political campaigns, spread antisemitic conspiracy theories, promoted narratives about Black American communities and COVID-19 that have been criticized as offensive, and was suspected of hiring private investigators to harass local election officials. Former Reno City Councilman Paul McKenzie filed a complaint accusing Beadles of not filing political expenses made by Beadles' PAC Operation Sunlight.

In August 2024, two election officials in Michigan alleged that the Holton Township clerk (a co-chair of the Michigan Republican Party who previously ran in the 2024 primary as a Republican for the Muskegon County Commissioner) did not turn in the votes from her town on the night of the primary, and then publicly accused them of losing the town's results.

In September 2024, the Center for Media and Democracy released a report identifying 239 Republican election administrators, candidates and party leaders in swing states that were part of the election denial movement. In October 2024, the RNC and Trump campaign co-hosted a training event for poll workers in Wisconsin and across the United States. Republican officials refused to make training materials public, with the exception of the point that poll workers were encouraged to report perceived suspicions to state RNC lawyers.

During elections in 2020, 2022, and 2024, several county commissioners in multiple swing states (Georgia, North Carolina, Nevada, Pennsylvania and Arizona), along with New Mexico, had voted not to certify the elections. Election experts were concerned that administrators could refuse to certify if Trump had lost the 2024 presidential election, potentially leading to results being decided by majority votes in the House of Representatives and the Senate.

In addition to precinct officers or poll workers, many election deniers have also been appointed as presidential electors for Trump in swing states for the 2024 election, among them at least 13 who participated in the Trump fake electors plot in 2020. Two poll watchers enlisted by the Georgia Republican Party had also participated in the Trump fake electors plot, while a third included the Cobb County, Georgia GOP chair who had also spread false information about the 2020 election. Election deniers have also ran in local school board elections.

An October 2024 bulletin from the state threat assessment center in Colorado warned of insider threats, "in which people with authorized access to the election process might attempt to derail it."

In October 2024, a precinct committeeman who was also a former Republican Congressional District candidate was arrested for stealing ballots.

Follow the Law, an organization with ties to Election Integrity Network, has published ads in swing states encouraging election officials to treat election certification as optional. Some ads disclosed that they were paid by organizations that were tied to groups to which Richard Uihlein has provided funding.

Two election judges in Minnesota were criminally charged for their actions on Election Day, one for serving in the same precinct where her husband was on the ballot for city council (who won the election), and the other for allowing 11 people to vote without registering.

In January 2025, performance auditors for the state of Utah found that election officials in Piute County, Utah and Wayne County, Utah "failed to comply with state law and put the integrity of multiple elections at risk in 2024".

==== Researchers ====
Starting in 2023, academic and private researchers of disinformation have been subject to subpoenas, lawsuits and public records requests by the House Judiciary Committee (led by Jim Jordan) and America First Legal (led by Stephen Miller), respectively, "accusing them of colluding with the [United States federal] government to suppress conservative speech online." These efforts, described as an "attempt to chill research", have not produced evidence "that government officials coerced [social media platforms] to take action against accounts" as of June 2023. America First Legal's efforts had been funded by conservative donors that are allied with Trump and have spread false claims of fraud during the 2020 elections, including $27 million from the Bradley Impact Fund and $1.3 million from the Conservative Partnership Institute. Lawsuits have also been filed against the federal government by the attorneys general of Missouri and Louisiana, as well as by Texas attorney general Ken Paxton, The Daily Wire and The Federalist. Researchers had been subject to increased time demands, legal costs and online harassment. Lawyers involved in Murthy v. Missouri have alleged that Jordan's subcommittee partially leaked closed door interviews to America First Legal for use in its own lawsuits, an allegation evidenced by the Stanford Internet Observatory. Subpoenas were also sent to large technology companies by the committee, alleging that they had a liberal bias. These actions, combined with reduced content moderation by social media platforms and progress in generative artificial intelligence, have occurred alongside an increase in online misinformation and disinformation. These actions also had a chilling effect on social media companies and federal government agencies sharing information with each other and medical misinformation. Mark Warner characterized the committee as a "concerted effort by partisan actors to intimidate and silence" misinformation researchers and expressed concern that its actions could hamper countering foreign disinformation and interference in the 2024 elections.

The U.S. Cybersecurity and Infrastructure Security Agency (CISA), which is responsible for protecting critical national infrastructure, has been repeatedly targeted by conservatives and Republican politicians. Under Project 2025, The Heritage Foundation recommended that CISA be dismantled and that it stop addressing election misinformation. These attacks had the indirect impact of discouraging collaboration with cybersecurity experts, including research that did not involve disinformation or elections. Election security researchers at DEF CON were also harassed by election deniers in 2022. By September 2024, Director Jen Easterly stated that the agency would not request that social media organizations remove posts containing election misinformation.

By January 2024, researchers, technologists and political scientists warned that "disinformation [posed] an unprecedented threat to democracy in the United States in 2024", especially from social media. By March 2024, The New York Times reported that Trump and his allies had "unquestionably prevailed" in their efforts to stop collaboration between social media companies, the Biden administration, and academic researchers to protect against election disinformation. By June 2024, one of the research groups targeted by the committee, the Stanford Internet Observatory, had refocused its work and its Election Integrity Partnership project had ended. In July 2024, several Republican lawmakers threatened against re-authorization of the Global Engagement Center, which had closed in December 2024 after Republicans had removed it from a funding bill.

=== Attacks ===
In August 2024, under the direction of Ken Paxton, Texas state authorities raided the homes of Hispanic campaign volunteers from the League of United Latin American Citizens (LULAC), as part of an investigation into alleged "election fraud and vote harvesting". Those who supported the volunteers characterized the raids as an attempt to suppress the Hispanic vote, and LULAC asked the United States Justice Department to investigate.

Many Congressional Republicans privately supported the second impeachment of Donald Trump, but did not vote in favor of impeachment, citing threats to themselves or their families. Vox viewed Trumpist threats as a form of discipline against elected Republican officials, "to force them to toe whatever line the Trumpists want them to walk, or else." Rachel Kleinfeld wrote, "Violence and threats against elected leaders are suppressing the emergence of a pro-democracy faction of the GOP".

Trump and other Republican politicians have repeatedly attacked journalists and media organizations, a complaint through the Federal Election Commission, threats of imprisonment, threats to revoke broadcast licenses, threats of violence, proposing laws that directly challenge New York Times Co. v. Sullivan, threats of lawfare, and designation as "enemy of the people" or similar insults.

Commentators have expressed concerns that these threats could make a chilling effect on editorial decisions of media outlets (self-censorship), especially if they make unintentional mistakes while criticizing political figures. These lawsuits and threats of lawsuits were characterized as attempts to punish outlets that criticize politicians by ultimately forcing those outlets to close through multiple, slow-moving damage claims. Journalists speculated that the withdrawal of editorial board endorsements for Kamala Harris in October 2024 by the owners of the Washington Post and the Los Angeles Times were an attempt to appease Trump if he won the election.

A June 2024 article from Salon argued that Trump and his allies have gone beyond the indirect language of stochastic terrorism towards direct orders for their followers to engage in violence. Experts and former United States government officials had previously come to similar conclusions, with Juliette Kayyem describing Trump's rhetoric as "true incitement" and "promoting terrorism."

Ivan Raiklin addressed an October 2024 Rod of Iron Ministries Freedom Festival, urging attendees to "confront" their state representatives with "evidence of the illegitimate steal" should Trump lose. He told attendees he was planning for a range of scenarios following the election, saying, "I have a plan and strategy for every single component of it. And then January 6 is going to be pretty fun." He added, "We run the elections. We try to play it fair. They steal it, our state legislatures are our final stop to guarantee a checkmate." Raiklin had previously characterized himself as Trump's "Secretary of Retribution" and said he had a prepared a "Deep State Target List' of over 350 people he would go after in a second Trump administration. Raiklin claims to have 80,000 recruits prepared to be deputized by constitutional sheriffs. On October 13 Trump expressed concerns about "radical left lunatics", and floated the idea of deploying the National Guard or the military.

An October 2024 Joint Intelligence Bulletin from the FBI and Department of Homeland Security warned that domestic extremists – motivated by election denial conspiracy theories, immigration, abortion, the LGBTQ community, and the two assassination attempts on Trump – posed a significant threat of violence during the election against politicians (incumbents and candidates), election staff, media staff and judges who are overseeing cases involving elections.

== Aftermath ==
In January 2025, Newsweek reported that two election integrity organizations, SMART Elections and Election Truth Alliance, had alleged voting irregularities during the 2024 election cycle, emphasizing that the allegations were speculative and not concrete proof of fraud. Both groups had analyzed "drop-off rate" – the difference in vote count between the presidential race and the next-highest down ballot statewide race (such as the United States Senate) on the same day. SMART Elections found that Trump had a significantly larger number of votes than the corresponding Republican Senate candidate or major down-ballot race, while Harris had significantly fewer votes compared to the corresponding Democratic Senate candidate or major down-ballot race, and that these findings primarily were observed for the six swing states analyzed. SMART Elections further broke down the data by county and found that, in North Carolina, Harris received fewer votes than the Democratic candidate for attorney general in every county in the state, while Trump received more votes than the Republican candidate for attorney general in every county in the state. Similar patterns were observed in eight other states. The group also gave some potential reasons for this discrepancy, including pro-Palestinian voters not supporting either candidate, voters who only care about Trump, and gender or racial biases against Harris.

Election Truth Alliance had observed results in Clark County, Nevada, that were "consistent with vote manipulation." The group analyzed cast vote records for that county (defined as an anonymized spreadsheet that shows how votes were cast) and alleged that early voting records were similar to a "Russian tail" (a statistical phenomenon commonly observed in Russia where election results deviate from a Gaussian distribution and may be an indicator of election fraud).

=== Media ===
Media coverage during the immediate aftermath of the election focused primarily on the conspiracy theory that Elon Musk used Starlink to hack the election results, which Snopes described as "unfounded". Allegations from left-wing social media users of election fraud during the aftermath of the 2024 United States presidential election had been dismissed as "baseless", described as part of BlueAnon, and compared to Stop the Steal.

Greg Palast criticized American mainstream media's reaction to voter suppression, writing, "The U.S. media will write about vote suppression tactics during an election. But never would the media report on the effect of suppression on the November 5 vote count."

Alternative media outlets The Canary and the Columbus Free Press called for an election audit or a hand recount, citing multiple bomb threats, voter roll purges and voting machine vulnerabilities.

Fact-checkers from PolitiFact and NewsGuard denied claims that Trump's comments about "vote-counting computers" were an indication of election fraud, deeming those claims as false. Similarly, some American and international mainstream media outlets described reactions to his comments as conspiracy theories.

=== Officials ===
As of December 18, 2024, "no Democratic lawmaker or election official has promoted the idea that the 2024 election was stolen", and "[Kamala] Harris has ignored pleas to challenge the result." The 2025 United States Electoral College vote count proceeded without any objections from lawmakers.

In response to Trump's comments about "vote-counting computers" the day before the inauguration, Democratic congresswoman Jasmine Crockett questioned whether Trump had admitted that he and Musk had committed electoral fraud, while Newsweek reported that Dan Goldman urged an investigation.

The Atlanta Black Star reported in March 2025 that Maxine Waters stated her intention to investigate Elon Musk with respect to his role in the 2024 election.

On November 13, 2024, a third open letter warned Kamala Harris of "serious election security breaches that have threatened the security and integrity of the 2024 elections" and urging her to request hand recounts in at least four swing states. The letter noted that voting system breaches have allowed for access to main servers, tabulators and election databases for both Dominion Voting Systems and Election Systems & Software, election vendors which collectively count approximately 70% of votes across the United States.

== See also ==
- Foreign interference in the 2024 United States elections
- 2024 North Carolina Supreme Court election
- How to Steal a Presidential Election
- Republican Party efforts to disrupt voting after the 2024 United States presidential election
