= Cage (disambiguation) =

A cage is a structure, typically an enclosure, made of mesh, bars or wires.

Cage or CAGE may also refer to:

== Structures ==
- Cage (bearing), a component of a rolling-element bearing
- Cage, a separated enclosure in a computer colocation centre
- Batting cage (or tunnel), an enclosure for baseball or softball batting practice
- Faraday cage, or Faraday shield, an enclosure used to block electromagnetic fields
- Rib cage, a part of the skeleton

== Places ==
- Cage (Srebrenik), a village in Bosnia and Herzegovina
- Cage, Croatia, a village

== People ==
- Cage (rapper) (born 1973), stage name of American rapper Chris Palko
- Brian Cage (born 1984), ring name of American professional wrestler Brian Button
- Buddy Cage (1946–2020), American pedal steel guitarist
- Byron Cage (born 1962), African-American gospel recording artist
- Christian Cage (born 1973), ring name of Canadian-American professional wrestler Jason Reso
- David Cage (born 1969), French video game designer
- Harry Cage (1795–1859), antebellum U.S. Congressman
- Jerron Cage (born 1998), American football player
- John Cage (1912–1992), American experimental composer
- Michael Cage (born 1962), American basketball player
- Nicolas Cage (born 1964), American actor
- Stuart Cage (born 1973), English golfer
- Wayne Cage (born 1951), American baseball player
- William Cage (disambiguation)

== Arts, entertainment, and media ==
=== Fictional entities ===
- Cage, in the video game Twisted Metal: Black
- John Cage (character), in the television show Ally McBeal
- Johnny Cage, a fictional character from the Mortal Kombat video games
- Luke Cage, a fictional character portrayed in Marvel Comics
- Xander Cage, the protagonist in the film XXX
- Cage Midwell, the protagonist of the video game Zone of the Enders: The Fist of Mars
- Cages (comics)

=== Music ===
- Cage (band), an American heavy metal band
- Cage the Elephant, an American alternative rock band
- "Cage", a song by Dir En Grey from the album Gauze
- "Cage", a song by Manafest from the album The Moment
- "Cages", a song by Chaos Divine from the album Avalon
- "Cages", a song by Deas Vail from the album Birds and Cages
- "Cages", a song by Tesseract from the album Polaris
- "Cages", a song by Baxter Dury from the album Floor Show

=== Other uses in arts, entertainment, and media ===
- Cage (film), a 1989 action film and its 1994 sequel Cage II
- "Cage" (Law & Order: Special Victims Unit), a television episode
- Cages (film), a 2005 film
- "Cages" (Juliet Bravo), a 1980 television episode
- Cages and Other Stories, by Andrew Michael Hurley

== Science and technology ==
- Cage (graph theory), a type of combinatorial graph
- CAGE questionnaire, a screening tool for determining alcoholism
- Cap analysis gene expression, a molecular biology technique

== Other uses ==
- CAGE (organisation), a London-based advocacy organization
- Commercial and Government Entity (CAGE) Code
- Iron cage, a sociological term

== See also ==
- Caging (disambiguation)
- Gabion, a cage filled with coarse gravel or rock
- La Cage (disambiguation)
- La Cage aux Folles (disambiguation)
- The Cage (disambiguation)
- The Gilded Cage
