= Caging =

Caging may refer to:

- Caging (direct mail), a practice in the direct mail industry
- Voter caging, a voter suppression technique
