= John Cage (disambiguation) =

John Cage (1912–1992) was an American composer.

John Cage may also refer to:

== People ==
- John Cage (Totteridge) (fl. circa 1600), manorial lord of Totteridge Manor, under Queen Elizabeth I of England
- Brian Button (born 1984), U.S. pro-wrestler with the ring name "Jonathan Cage"

== Fictional characters ==
- John Cage (character), a fictional character from the Ally McBeal television series
- Johnny Cage, a fictional character from the Mortal Kombat series of video games

== Other ==
- John Cage Day, a designation given to a number of events in 2012 commemorating the composer
- John Cage Award, a biennial grant offered by the Foundation for Contemporary Arts

== See also ==
- All pages with titles containing "John" and "Cage"
- John (given name)
- John (disambiguation)
- Cage (disambiguation)
