= Misnomer =

Word or term that suggests a meaning that is known to be wrong

A misnomer is a name that is incorrectly or unsuitably applied. Misnomers often arise because something was named long before its correct nature was known, or because an earlier form of something has been replaced by a later form to which the name no longer suitably applies. A misnomer may also be a word that is used incorrectly or misleadingly. The word misnomer does not mean "misunderstanding" or "popular misconception", and a number of misnomers remain in common usage — which is to say that a word being a misnomer does not necessarily make usage of the word incorrect.

== Sources of misnomers ==
- An older name being retained after the thing itself has changed (e.g., tin can, mince meat pie, steamroller, tin foil, clothes iron, digital darkroom), known as an anachronym. This is essentially a metaphorical extension with the name of the older item standing for anything filling the same role.
- Transference of a well-known product brand name into a genericized trademark (e.g., Xerox for photocopy, Kleenex for tissues, or Jell-O for gelatin dessert).
- Pars pro toto (i.e., the name of a part being applied to the whole). Holland is often used to refer to the Netherlands, while it is actually only a part of that country.
- Referring to the suburbs of a metropolis by the name of its biggest city. (e.g., referring to Allen, Texas as "Dallas").
- A name based on a similarity in a particular aspect (e.g., "shooting stars" look like falling stars but are actually meteors).
- A difference between popular and technical meanings of a term. A koala "bear" superficially looks and acts like a bear, but is quite distinct and unrelated. Fireflies fly like flies, and ladybugs are like bugs. Botanically, peanuts are not nuts. The technical sense is often cited as "correct", but this is a matter of context.
- Ambiguity. A parkway is generally a road with park-like landscaping, not a place to park. Such a term may confuse those unfamiliar with the language.
- Association of a thing with a place other than its origin. Panama hats originate from Ecuador, but came to be associated with the building of the Panama Canal.
- Naming particular to the originator's world view.
- An unfamiliar name – perhaps foreign – or technical term re-analyzed as something more familiar, as with folk etymology.
- Anachronisms, juxtaposed terms from different time periods, creating chronological inconsistency.

== Examples ==
=== Older name retained ===
The term anachronym refers to the type of misnomer where older name is retained after the thing itself has changed. Anachronym should not be confused with anacronym, which refers to words (such as laser, sonar and scuba) with acronymic origin but which are now used syntactically as words in their own right.

- Aluminium foil is sometimes called tin foil even when it is made of aluminium, whereas tin cans made for the storage of food products are made from steel with a thin tin plating. In both cases, tin was the original metal.
- The "lead" in pencils is made of graphite and clay, not lead; graphite was once believed to be lead ore. The graphite and clay mix is known as plumbago, meaning "lead ore" in Latin.
- Blackboards can be black, green, red, blue, or brown.
- Sticks of chalk are no longer made of chalk, but of gypsum.
- Telephone numbers are referred to as being "dialed" although rotary phones are now rare.
- In golf, the clubs referred to as woods were once made of wood but are now usually made of metal.
- The Pennsylvania Dutch people are German Americans and the Pennsylvania Dutch language is a dialect of German only distantly related to Dutch. Even though the term "Dutch" in English has narrowed to denote Netherlands origin only, it originally encompassed all Germanic peoples.

=== Similarity of appearance ===
- Head cheese is a meat product.
- A horned toad is a lizard.
- A velvet ant is a wasp.

=== Difference between common and technical meanings ===
- Koala "bears" are marsupials not closely related to the bear family, Ursidae. The term "koala" is preferred in their native Australia.
- Jellyfish and starfish are only very distantly related to fish, being in separate phyla. The gelatinous structure of jellyfish is similar to gelatin dessert.
- A peanut is not a nut in the botanical sense, but a legume. A coconut is not a botanical nut but a drupe.
- Fruits that are not botanically considered berries include strawberries, bayberries, raspberries, and blackberries.

=== Association with place other than that which one may assume ===
- The guinea pig (Cavia porcellus) originated in the Andes, not Guinea, and is a rodent unrelated to pigs.
- French horns originated in Germany, not France.
- Chinese checkers originated in Germany.

=== Other ===
- Although dry cleaning does not involve water, it does involve the use of liquid solvents.
- The "funny bone" is not a bone—the phrase refers to the ulnar nerve.
- Although it has "socialism" in the name, national socialism is not a socialist ideology as it still upholds private property.
- A quantum leap is properly an instantaneous change that may be large or small. In physics, it is a change of an electron from one energy level to another. In common usage the term is often used to mean a large, abrupt change.
- "Tennis elbow" (formally lateral epicondylitis) does not necessarily result from playing tennis.

== See also ==
- Oxymoron
- Metonymy
