= The Golden Cage =

The Golden Cage may refer to:

== Books ==
- The Golden Cage (memoir), a 2011 memoir by Iranian human rights activist Shirin Ebadi
- The Golden Cage (novel), a 2019 Swedish novel by Camilla Läckberg

== Film ==
- The Golden Cage (1933 film), a British drama film
- The Golden Cage (1975 film), an Australian film about two Turkish migrants
- The Golden Dream (Spanish: La Jaula de Oro), a 2013 Mexican film also titled The Golden Cage

== Television ==
- The Golden Cage (TV series) (De Gouden Kooi), a Dutch reality TV show

== See also ==
- Cage of Gold, a 1950 British drama film directed by Basil Dearden
- The Gilded Cage (disambiguation)
- La jaula de oro (disambiguation)
