= Voter caging =

Challenging and removing voter names from voter registration lists

Voter caging is a colloquial term used in the United States referring to a campaign activity used to remove, or attempt to remove, targeted voters from official lists of registered voters. It occurs when a non-governmental organization, such as a political party or a campaign, sends first-class mail to registered voters, in order to compile a so-called "challenge list" of the names of those whose letters are returned undelivered. The fact that the mail was returned as undeliverable may be seen as either proof, or strong evidence of, the person no longer residing at the address on their voter registration. The challenge list is presented to election officials with the suggestion that the officials should purge these names from the voter registration rolls or to challenge voters' eligibility to vote on the grounds that the voters no longer reside at their registered addresses.

The phrase "voter caging" came about as a metaphorical extension of the benign term "caging" that is used in the direct mail industry.

In the United States, official government election offices are required to periodically maintain and update their lists of registered voters, also known as voter rolls. Organizations such as the American Civil Liberties Union and Fair Fight Action periodically take to the courts to challenge the methods used by official government election offices to maintain the rolls. Some voter roll maintenance tactics are prohibited by the Voting Rights Act of 1965.

== Method ==
Voter caging refers to the practice of sending mail to addresses on the voter rolls, compiling a list of the mail that is returned undelivered, and using that list to challenge voters' registrations and votes on the grounds that the voters on the roll do not legally reside at their registered addresses.

More concretely, a political party or campaign will send out non-forwardable, first-class mail to voters or particular voters they want to target (often assumed to be a demographic that belongs to the opposing party). It will compile a list of voters for whom mail has been returned as undeliverable. The list is called a caging list. First-class mail marked as non-forwardable has resulted in a rate of return (returned and marked undeliverabl) as high as one return for every fifteen letters sent out. The so-called "caging list" that is the compiled names of all those for whom the envelopes were returned, marked undeliverable, can then be presented by the political party or campaign to election officials, with a request that the election officials should proceed to purge those people from the list of registered voters, or at a minimum, take a second look at whether the voter still resides at the address of registration. Election officials are not required to remove names based on having been presented with a caging list.

When a voter turns out to vote, who has been identified as no longer living at the address on their voter registration, election officials at the polling place may challenge their registration and require them to cast a provisional ballot. If investigation of the provisional ballot demonstrates that the voter has just moved or there is an error in the address and the voter is legally registered, the vote would then be counted. Opponents of this practice say that it is an unreliable method for determining whether a voter is ineligible to vote.

== History ==
=== 1980s ===
Actions of the Ballot Security Task Force in New Jersey in 1981 are believed to be the first wide-scale use of voter caging as a campaign tactic. The RNC sent letters to predominantly-black neighborhoods in New Jersey in 1981. When 45,000 letters were returned as undeliverable, the RNC compiled a challenge list to remove those voters from the rolls. The RNC additionally sent off-duty law enforcement officials to the polls and hung posters in heavily black neighborhoods warning that violating election laws is a crime. Believing that these tactics violated the Voting Rights Act, the Democratic National Committee took the RNC to federal court. Rather than see the case fully litigated, the RNC entered a consent decree, which prohibited the party from engaging in anti-fraud initiatives that targeted minorities from conducting mail campaigns to "compile voter challenge lists".

In Louisiana in 1986, the RNC tried to have 31,000 voters, mostly black, removed from the rolls when a party mailer was returned. Again, the action was successfully challenged in federal court.

=== 1993 National Voter Registration Act ===
Section 8 of the National Voter Registration Act of 1993 (NVRA) has been interpreted to prohibit voter caging:

"Pursuant to the NVRA, a voter may not be removed from the voters list unless (1) the voter has requested removal; (2) state law requires removal by reason of criminal conviction or mental capacity; (3) the voter has confirmed in writing that he has moved outside the jurisdiction maintaining the specific voter list, or (4) the voter both (a) has failed to respond to a cancellation notice issued pursuant to the NVRA and (b) has not voted or appeared to vote in the two federal general elections following the date of notice."

=== 2004 elections ===
BBC journalist Greg Palast obtained an RNC document entitled "State Implementation Template III.doc" that described Republican election operations for caging plans in numerous states. The paragraph in the document pertaining to caging was:

V. Pre Election Day Operations New Registration Mailing
At whatever point registration in the state closes, a first class mailing should be sent to all new registrants as well as purged/inactive voters. This mailing should welcome the recipient to the voter rolls. It is important that a return address is clearly identifiable. Any mail returned as undeliverable for any reason, should be used to generate a list of problematic registrations. Poll watchers should have this list and be prepared to challenge anyone from this list attempting to vote.

Shortly before the 2004 election, Palast also obtained a caging list for Jacksonville, Florida, which contained many blacks and registered Democrats. The list was attached to an email that a Florida Republican Party official was sending to RNC headquarters official Tim Griffin.

The Republican National Committee also sent letters to minority areas in Cleveland, Ohio. When 35,000 letters were returned as undeliverable, the party employed poll watchers to challenge the voters' right to vote. Civil liberties groups challenged the RNC in a case that went to the Supreme Court, but the RNC was not stopped from challenging the voters.

Similarly, the RNC sent out 130,000 letters to minority areas in mostly-black Philadelphia, Pennsylvania.

=== 2008 elections ===
In December 2007, Kansas Republican Chair Kris Kobach sent an email boasting that "to date, the Kansas GOP has identified and caged more voters in the last 11 months than the previous two years!"

Republicans sent out fundraising mailers to voters in five Florida counties: Duval, Hillsborough, Collier, Miami-Dade and Escambia, with 'do not forward' on the letters. The mailers included inaccurate voter ID numbers and ostensibly confirmed with voters they were registered as Republican. The RNC declined to discuss the mailer with the St. Petersburg Times. A representative denied that the mailing had anything to do with caging. Two top Florida elections officials, both Republicans, faulted the Republican mailing, calling it "confusing" and "unfortunate" because of a potential to undermine voter confidence by making them question the accuracy of their registrations." Some officials expressed concern that the RNC would try to use a caging list derived from the mailers.

In Northern California, reports of voter caging emerged when letters marked 'do not forward' were sent to Democrats with fake voter ID numbers. The description of the letters matched the letters that were sent out in Florida. Many details on the letters were false; for example, the letters referred to a Voter Identification Division, but RNC personnel said they had no such department. The RNC did not return calls from a news organization regarding the letters.

On October 5, 2008, the Republican Lieutenant Governor of Montana, John Bohlinger, accused the Montana Republican Party of vote caging to purge 6,000 voters from three counties that trend Democratic. The purges included decorated war veterans and active duty soldiers.

Terri Lynn Land, the Secretary of State of Michigan, was found to be purging thousands of voters from voting rolls based on Voter ID cards being returned as undeliverable. The American Civil Liberties Union (ACLU) took Michigan to court over the purges. Judge Stephen J. Murphy ruled the purge illegal under the National Voter Registration Act of 1993 and directed Land to reinstate the affected voters.

=== 2013: RNC v. DNC retention of consent decree ===
In the years since the original 1982 consent decree on voter caging, a series of suits and countersuits between the RNC and the DNC as well as civil rights groups and labor unions ensued. The RNC would attempt to have the consent decree lifted and other parties would attempt to have the decree enforced in specific cases in which the plaintiffs would allege the RNC was in violation of the decree. In November 2008, the RNC sought to have the consent decree lifted in the U.S. District Court in Newark (Republican National Committee v. Democratic National Committee). Judge Dickinson R. Debevoise rejected the effort, and his ruling was upheld by the Third US Circuit Court of Appeals. The Third Circuit ruling found, "It is not in the public interest to vacate the decree." It also stated, "If the RNC does not hope to engage in conduct that would violate the Decree, it is puzzling that the RNC is pursuing vacatur so vigorously notwithstanding the District Court's significant modifications to the Decree." The RNC then petitioned the Supreme Court of the United States to hear an appeal of the Third Circuit ruling but the Supreme Court declined to hear the case, leaving the Third Circuit ruling to stand as legally binding.

=== 2016: No new violation established ===
"On October 26, 2016, the DNC filed a motion asking that the court find the RNC had violated the decree. On November 5, after abbreviated discovery, the district court denied the DNC’s request, ruling that the DNC had not provided sufficient evidence of coordination between the Trump campaign and the RNC on ballot-security operations, but will allow the DNC to offer further evidence after the election," according to the Brennan Center for Justice at New York University School of Law.

=== 2017: Consent decree expired ===
On January 8, 2018, the US District Court for the District of New Jersey declined to extend the consent decree beyond its previous December 1, 2017, expiration date, because, “the DNC did not prove, by a preponderance of the evidence, a violation of the [1982] Consent Decree before December 1, 2017”. Harvard Law Professor Nicholas Stephanopoulos suggested this decision was at least partially influenced by a general decline in the willingness of courts to intervene in election law issues, as witnessed by several moderately recent decisions by the Supreme Court of the United States, especially in Shelby County v. Holder.

== See also ==
- Disenfranchisement
- Voter suppression in the United States
- Identity cleansing
- Paper genocide
- Tribal disenrollment
