= The Best Democracy Money Can Buy =

Book by Greg Palast

- Author: Greg Palast
- Publisher: Pluto Press, London
- Publication date: 2002
- Pages: 211
- ISBN: 0-452-28391-4
- OCLC: 48110962

The Best Democracy Money Can Buy: An Investigative Reporter Exposes the Truth about Globalization, Corporate Cons, and High Finance Fraudsters is a 2002 book by investigative journalist Greg Palast. It is about corporate corruption, global capitalism, environmental destruction, third world exploitation, freedom of speech and political corruption, and the United States presidential election of 2000. Palast used the book as the basis for his 2004 documentary film Bush Family Fortunes.

== Content ==
The first chapter goes into great depth covering the Florida Central Voter File, commonly referred to as the Florida scrub list, starting with a Thomas Cooper who was prevented from voting in 2000 because of a supposed January 30, 2007 conviction date.
