= La jaula de oro =

La jaula de oro (Spanish "the golden cage", not capitalized in Spanish) is a title which can refer to several works:

- Jaula de Oro (album), 1984 album by Los Tigres del Norte
  - "Jaula de oro" (song)
- La jaula de oro (1987 film), inspired by the song
- La jaula de oro (TV series), a 1997 Mexican soap opera
- The Golden Dream (La jaula de oro in Spanish), a 2013 film by Diego Quemada-Díez
- La jaula de oro, 1986 poetry collection by Altair Tejeda de Tamez

== See also ==
- The Golden Cage (disambiguation)
- Cage of Gold
