= Vigilantes Inc. =

2024 documentary about U.S. voter suppression

Vigilantes Inc.: America's New Vote Suppression Hitmen is an American documentary film directed by David Ambrose, narrated by Rosario Dawson, that premiered on YouTube in October 2024. The film was executive produced by Martin Sheen.

Led by investigative journalist Greg Palast, the film documents voter suppression in the United States by "vigilante" challenges of self-appointed electoral fraud hunters, not government officials, who are targeting well over one million people jto challenge and block the counting of their ballots. The majority of the vigilantes' targets are young voters and minorities. Currently, the Donald Trump-sponsored group True the Vote has gone from 88 vigilantes to over 40,000 “volunteers” in 43 US states.

== See also ==
- Republican Party efforts to disrupt the 2024 United States presidential election
