= Bush Family Fortunes: The Best Democracy Money Can Buy =

- DVD cover
- Directed by: Steven Grandison; Greg Palast
- Written by: Greg Palast
- Produced by: Meirion Jones; Greg Palast; Linda Levy; Leni Von Ekhardt; Duane Andrews
- Edited by: Jonathan Levin
- Music by: Daron Murphy; Lem Jay Ignacio; Adam Hawkins; Laura Dawn; Rıchard Ray Harris; Moby
- Production company: Disinformation Company
- Release date: September 28, 2004
- Running time: 62 mins
- Country: United States
- Language: English

Bush Family Fortunes: The Best Democracy Money Can Buy is a 2004 documentary film directed by Steven Grandison and Greg Palast. The film, which examines various aspects of the presidency of George W. Bush, including the 2000 US presidential election and the Iraq War, is adapted from the 2003 BBC production Bush Family Fortunes and based on the 2002 book The Best Democracy Money Can Buy by investigative journalist Palast, who had spent years tracking the Bush family for the BBC and The Guardian newspaper. The research for the original BBC film, which claims to have exposed the George W. Bush military service controversy, was also drawn upon by Michael Moore for Fahrenheit 9/11 (2004) and footage was used by Robert Greenwald in Unprecedented: The 2000 Presidential Election (2002).

== Synopsis ==
Pre-title footage from presenter Greg Palast's cut-off interview with Florida Director of Elections Clayton Roberts, who exits the room, opens the movie.

=== The war hero ===
Palast introduces George W. Bush with particular reference to his popular image as a war hero cemented in the public mind by his landing on the aircraft carrier USS Abraham Lincoln for the 2003 Mission Accomplished Speech. He introduces authentic former Navy fighter pilot Charles W. "Bill" White, who exposes W. Bush's attempted reenactment of Tom Cruise's Top Gun carrier landing following a heroic Mig shootdown as the pathetic publicity stunt that it was. Palast goes on to allege that Bush used his father's influence to gain a draft-dodging placement with the Texas Air National Guard which he subsequently failed to serve.

=== The candidate ===
Palast picks up the story with Bush's 2000 US presidential election campaign where he claims Florida Governor Jeb Bush and Florida Secretary of State Katherine Harris used their influence to purge and discount the ballots of predominantly Gore-supporting black voters through the “fake felons list” compiled by private company DBT/ChoicePoint for US$4 million.

=== The money ===
Palast goes on to examine the corporate donors to Bush's election campaign, such as Enron CEO Ken Lay, who as members of Bush's pioneer network contributed huge sums through family and friends, and who he claims subsequently profited from the Bush presidency with senior government appointments, no-bid contracts, executive orders and deregulation.

=== The oil ===
Palast outlines what he refers to as the Bush-cycle, where Bush family members use money to gain political office and then use the office to gain even more money, dating back to Senator Prescott Bush who funded the family's entry into the oil business, citing the example of Bush's Harken Energy winning a contract to drill in the Persian Gulf thanks he alleges to Bush Snr's presidency.

=== The connection ===
Palast alleges that both prior to and since the September 11 attacks Bush has blocked investigations into members of the Bin Laden family and other rich Saudis, who are alleged to have provided funding to Al Qaeda and which have long been funnelling money into Bush family business ventures via businessman James R. Bath, who was a part owner of Bush's failed Arbusto Energy. Navy fighter pilot [[Charles W. ["Bill"] White]], who was Bath's business partner and close confidant during the decade of the 1980s, is revealed to be the source who first disclosed Bath's tax returns and personal financial statements showing that Bath was awarded a 5% ownership interest in W. Bush's Arbusto in lieu of a cash commission for having funneled BinLaden money to Bush.

=== The Plan: Iraq ===
Palast concludes with Bush's declaration of the Iraq War, which he claims was made to fulfil a long planned strategy, drawn up at the beginning of Bush's presidency, to divide and sell up all of Iraq's assets, especially the oil, to the Bush family's corporate donors against the interests of the Iraqi people and their democratic ambitions.

== Participants ==
- Clayton Roberts – Director of Elections, Florida
- Jim Hightower – Former Texas Agriculture Commissioner
- Charles W. ["Bill"] White – Former Navy Fighter Pilot and Bath's longtime business partner
- Terry Johnson – Bush's College Roommate
- Robert Dieter – Bush's College Roommate
- Bill Burkett – Retired Lt. Col., Texas Air Guard
- Willie Steen – Florida Voter
- Pam Iorio – Election Supervisor, Tampa, Florida
- Craig McDonald – Texans for Public Justice
- Andrea & Dean McWilliams – Bush/Enron Lobbyists
- Nick Kralj – Democratic Lobbyist
- Wayne Madsen – author
- Pete Brewton – investigative journalist
- David Rosen – Oilman
- Stephen Push – Families of September 11
- Ron Motley – Lawyer
- General Jay Garner
- Grover Norquist – Lobbyist

== See also ==
- Unprecedented: The 2000 Presidential Election (2002)
- Fahrenheit 9/11 (2004)
