= Switch (American TV series) =

TV series

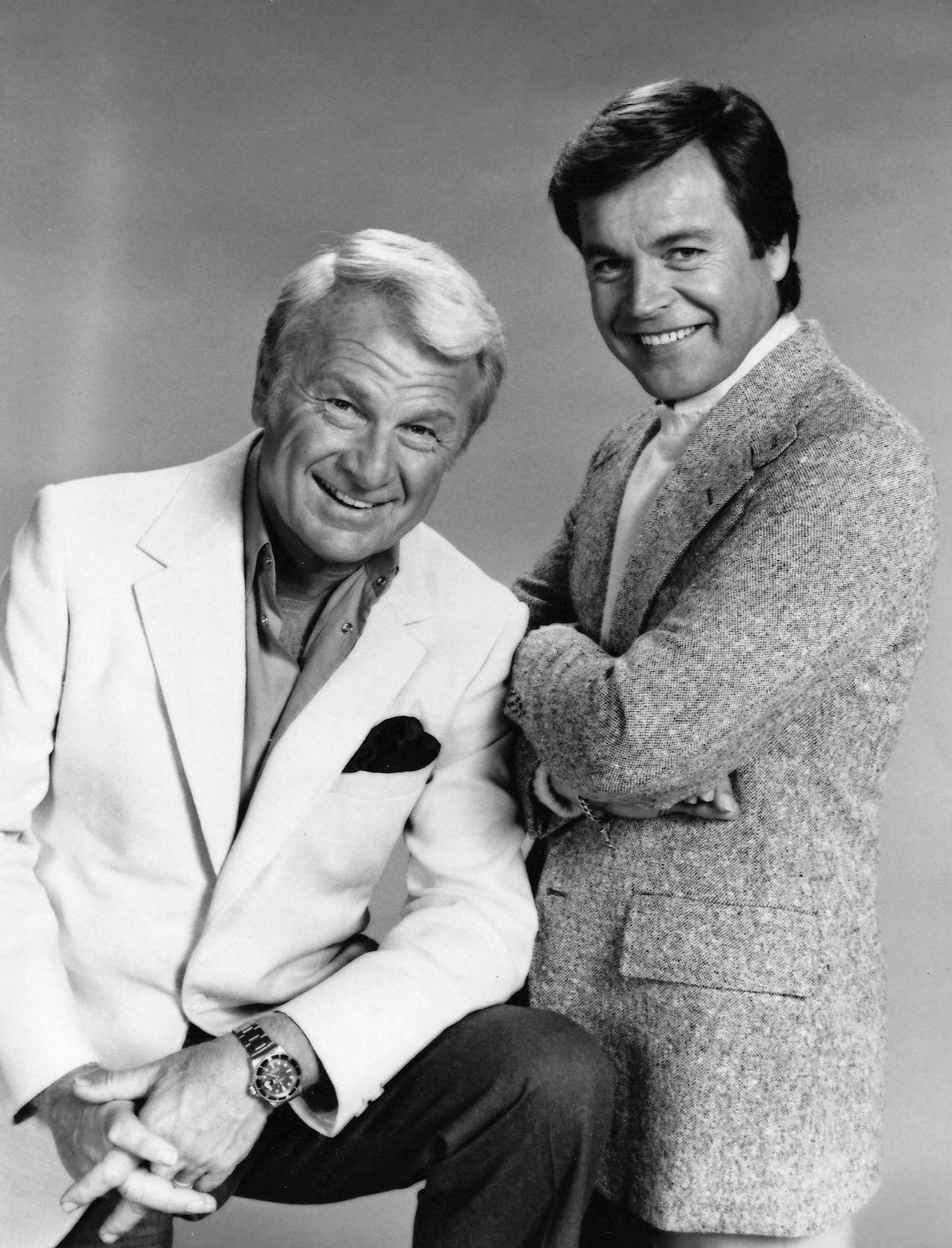
- Eddie Albert and Robert Wagner, 1975.
- Genre: Detective fiction
- Created by: Glen A. Larson
- Starring: Robert Wagner; Eddie Albert; Charlie Callas; Sharon Gless; William Bryant; James Hong; Mindi Miller
- Theme music composer: Glen A. Larson
- Composer: Stu Phillips
- Country of origin: United States
- Original language: English
- No. of seasons: 3
- No. of episodes: 70 (list of episodes)

Production
- Executive producers: Glen A. Larson; Jon Epstein; Matthew Rapf
- Running time: 47–50 minutes
- Production companies: Glen Larson Productions; Universal Television

Original release
- Network: CBS
- Release: September 9, 1975 – August 27, 1978

Switch is an American action-adventure detective series starring Robert Wagner and Eddie Albert. It was broadcast on the CBS network for three seasons between September 9, 1975, and August 27, 1978, bumping the Hawaii Five-O detective series to Friday nights.

== Background ==
Switch was inspired by the 1973 movie The Sting and was similar to The Rockford Files, which had debuted a year earlier. It was created by Glen A. Larson; Donald P. Bellisario was also one of the writers. In his memoir, The Garner Files, Rockford Files star James Garner accuses Larson of essentially rewriting Rockford scripts without authorization for use on this show. After intervention by the Writers Guild of America, the first-season episode "Death by Resurrection" was deemed to have been a rewrite of the Rockford episode "This Case Is Closed", and was (as broadcast) credited solely to the writers of the original Rockford Files episode.

The series focused on two main characters, Frank MacBride (Eddie Albert) and Pete Ryan (Robert Wagner). MacBride was a retired bunco cop who once arrested Ryan, a con man. After Ryan's release from prison, the two men opened a detective agency in Los Angeles. Their speciality involves the use of confidence tricks to trap criminals into revealing evidence of their guilt. Assisting them is another reformed con man, restaurant owner Malcolm Argos (Charlie Callas), and Maggie Philbin (Sharon Gless), Mac and Pete's naive-but-competent receptionist and assistant.

The series pilot for CBS aired on March 21, 1975, as a 90-minute made-for-television movie. William Bryant joined the cast as Lt. Shilton in season two, and Mindi Miller and James Hong joined the cast in season three. In the third season, Pete moves into an apartment above Malcolm's bar.

The modestly successful show was put on hiatus in early 1978, its time slot taken by The Incredible Hulk. The remaining 10 unaired episodes were broadcast the following summer before the series was cancelled in August due to low ratings.

== Cast ==
Actor	Role	Notes
Eddie Albert	Frank "Mac" MacBride	
Robert Wagner	Peterson T. "Pete" Ryan	
Charlie Callas	Malcolm Argos	
Sharon Gless	Maggie Philbin	
William Bryant	Lt. Shilton	Seasons 2–3
James Hong	Wang, Malcolm's cook	Season 3
Mindi Miller	Revel, a waitress who works at Malcolm's restaurant	Season 3

Eddie Albert and Robert Wagner are the only actors to appear in every episode. Sharon Gless appeared in all but three episodes, and Charlie Callas did not appear in four episodes during the run.

In addition, Anne Archer recurred in the first season as Laurie, a grifter who helps Mac and Pete with their sting operations (clips of the actress in character appeared in the opening credits sequence during the first and second seasons).

== Legacy ==
The short-lived 1976–1977 ABC crime drama The Feather and Father Gang was seen as an unsuccessful attempt to imitate Switch. Coincidentally, Wagner later costarred with one of the stars of The Feather and Father Gang, Stefanie Powers, in another crime drama, Hart to Hart, which ran for five seasons beginning in 1979.

== See also ==
- McCoy, a similarly themed TV series that also debuted in 1975
