= Interstate Voter Registration Crosscheck Program =

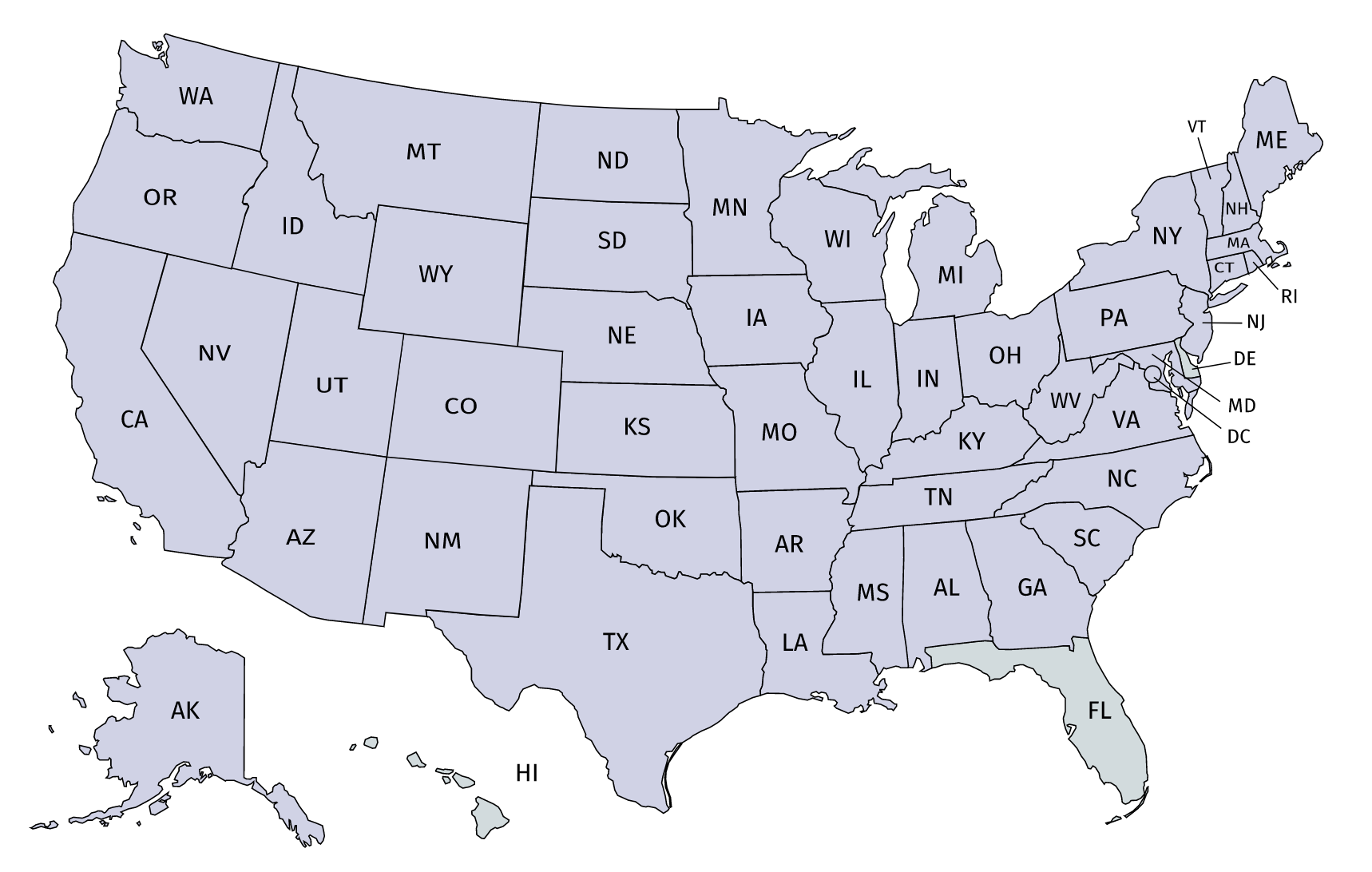
No states are currently using the Crosscheck program due to its legal suspension

Interstate Voter Registration Crosscheck (commonly referred to as IVRC or Crosscheck) was a database in the United States which aggregated voter registration records from multiple states to identify voters who may have registered or voted in two or more states. Crosscheck was developed in 2005 by Kansas Secretary of State Ron Thornburgh in conjunction with Iowa, Missouri, and Nebraska. In December 2019, the program was suspended indefinitely as part of a settlement of a lawsuit filed by the American Civil Liberties Union of Kansas challenging Kansas' management of the program. Prior to Crosscheck's legally mandated suspension, a dozen states had withdrawn from the program citing the inaccurate data and risk of violating voters' privacy rights. Crosscheck was also accused of facilitating unlawful purges of voters in a racially discriminatory manner.

== History ==
Crosscheck was initiated in December 2005 at the Midwest Election Officials Conference (MEOC) by the office of the Kansas Secretary of State in coordination with Iowa, Missouri and Nebraska. The program combined each state's voter rolls into a database and sought to identify potential duplicate registrations by comparing first name, last name, and full date of birth. In 2006, the first crosscheck was conducted using voter registration records from Kansas, Iowa, Missouri, and Nebraska. In 2017, the last Crosscheck was conducted with records from 28 states.

The program was administered by the office of the Kansas Secretary of State as a free service to all member states.

Under then-Kansas Secretary of State Kris Kobach, the program expanded rapidly from thirteen states in 2010 to a peak of 29 states in 2014. In 2017, Crosscheck analyzed 98 million voter registration records from 28 states and returned 7.2 million "potential duplicate registrant" records to member states.

== Accuracy ==
Crosscheck considered two voter registrations potential duplicates if they matched on first name, last name, and full date of birth even if the last four digits of the social security number (SSN4) of the two records did not match, or when one or both SSN4 were missing.

Matching based on first name, last name, and date of birth "fails for practically all common American names" according to ID Analytics analysis of a database of over 300 million unique records.

Crosscheck's use of loose matching standards led to a high rate of false positives: pairs of voter registration records lacking a match on SSN4 but who are identified as "potential duplicate registrants" by Crosscheck. Although false positives created a myriad of issues, the Kansas Secretary of State's office did not publicly release the percentage of their widely publicized "potential duplicate registrants" which were false positives. Independent researchers point to public data from Virginia's 2013 Annual Report on List Maintenance, which documented a 75% false positive rate.

For voters and member states, misidentification can be costly. Each voter who is misidentified faces an incremental privacy risk when their personally identifying information is exported to at least one state beyond his or her state of residence, and the registrant risks being inappropriately inactivated or removed from voter rolls. In Ada County, Idaho, election officials relied on Crosscheck's list of "potential duplicate registrants" to mistakenly remove 766 voters. None were duplicate registrants.

To avoid inappropriate deletion of eligible voters as occurred in Ada County, member states invested in extensive processing to vet each Crosscheck record. In May 2018, the New Hampshire Secretary of State's office reported that 817 work hours over nearly a year were required to process the 2017 Crosscheck results for their state. Despite that intensive effort, staff found no evidence of widespread double voting. Similarly, Virginia's 2015 Annual List Maintenance Report stated "the Crosscheck program does not have a direct fee associated with it, however, the initial data received from Crosscheck requires significant agency handling to determine what data is usable and what data is not usable. Crosscheck data is prone to false positives since the initial matching is only conducted using first name, last name, and date of birth. The need to greatly refine and analyze Crosscheck data has required significant ELECT staff resources that are not accounted for when proponents claim the program is 'free'."

Prior to the legally mandated suspension of the program, 12 states (Alaska, Arizona, Colorado, Florida, Illinois, Kentucky, Massachusetts, New York, Oregon, Pennsylvania, Virginia, and Washington) had withdrawn from the free program.

Despite over seven million "potential double registrants" being "flagged" by the Crosscheck program in 2014, less than four people were charged with voting more than once, and not a single flagging led to a conviction, casting doubt on the system's usefulness.

== Discrimination allegations ==
The loose matching standards used to identify "potential duplicate registrants" by the Kansas Secretary of State also raised significant concerns about the opportunity for racial bias in list maintenance. According to "Health of State Democracies", "50 percent of Communities of Color share a common surname, while only 30 percent of white people do," so that in the program's flagged lists, "white voters are underrepresented by 8 percent, African Americans are overrepresented by 45 percent; Hispanic voters are overrepresented by 24 percent; and Asian voters are overrepresented by 31 percent".

After examining "potential duplicate registrant" lists from some of the participating states, investigative reporter Greg Palast claimed the Crosscheck system "disproportionately threatens solid Democratic constituencies: young, black, Hispanic and Asian-American voters" with the intention of securing Republican victories. Palast concluded this was achieved by eliminating discrete individuals based on nothing more than similarity of name, a method with a "built-in racial bias" that especially eliminated voters from targeted minorities with a more limited pool of given names, for example, Hispanic voters named Jose Garcia.

However, presence on the "potential duplicate registrant" list did not mean a voter was removed from the rolls. Independent investigators found that most states reported not using the Crosscheck "potential duplicate registrant" lists in any way.

== Data security and data handling lapses ==
Articles in ProPublica and Gizmodo, relying on information provided by activists in Illinois and Kansas, revealed in fall 2017 that the Kansas-managed database holding nearly 100 million records of private voter data were protected by security protocols so flawed they could be "hacked by a novice". Kansas Secretary of State Kris Kobach demurred saying "I don't concede there is a problem" but also pledged to quickly fix the data security issues. After a subsequent consultation with the Division of Homeland Security, Kobach quietly halted Crosscheck for 2018 in advance of his gubernatorial race in Kansas. His successor as Kansas Secretary of State Scott Schwab subsequently settled a lawsuit filed by ACLU of Kansas alleging that the constitutional right of their plaintiffs to privacy was violated by his office's careless handling of a Crosscheck file.

Schwab's settlement acknowledged errors in handling voters' private data and requires that Kansas suspend the program until stringent data security standards are in place.

== Utility ==
Crosscheck was frequently cited, without supporting evidence, as a critical tool to prevent voter fraud. Critics said that Crosscheck's utility was limited to a very specific type of fraud (double voting), in a very specific situation (across state lines), at very specific times (general elections only). Double voting within a state cannot be detected. Double voting in a primary election cannot be detected. Voting on the records of a deceased person cannot be detected.

In addition to problems with false positives and limited scope, Crosscheck has also had false negative results: the failure to recognize voters who are registered in two states if there is even a slight variation in their name. For example, Vic Miller registered in Kansas would not be recognized as the same as Victor Miller registered in Missouri despite the same full date of birth and last four digits of the social security number.

== Voter registration maintenance programs ==
Debate about Crosscheck is part of a larger, ongoing controversy over whether or not such voter registration programs are a valid means of protecting against fraud.

A 2018 study by researchers at Stanford University, University of Pennsylvania, Yale University, and Harvard University quantified the tradeoff between voter accessibility and electoral integrity when purging a likely duplicate registration from another state using Crosscheck. Their analysis of Crosscheck results in from Iowa in 2012 and 2014 suggests that for every double vote prevented, use of Crosscheck's proposed purge strategy impedes approximately 300 legitimate registrations. This finding is in a "best practices" scenario in which all false positives have been removed. The authors emphasize that election authorities should consider the tradeoff between election access for all eligible voters and fraud prevention.

== See also ==
- Electronic Registration Information Center, the de facto, less labor-intensive successor to CrossCheck
