= List of Switch episodes =

Episodes for CBS television series

This is a list of episodes for the CBS television series Switch.

== Series overview ==
At present, this series has not been released on home video.

Season	Episodes	Originally released	
Season	Episodes	First released	Last released
Pilot		March 21, 1975	
1	24	September 9, 1975	April 6, 1976
2	24	September 21, 1976	April 3, 1977
3	22	September 23, 1977	August 27, 1978

== Episodes ==
=== Pilot (1975) ===
This pilot is divided into two parts for syndication. Co-director Allen Baron goes uncredited.

Title	Directed by	Written by	Original release date
"Switch"	Robert Day & Allen Baron	Glen A. Larson	March 21, 1975
An ex-con (Robert Wagner) and a retired cop (Eddie Albert), partners in a private investigation agency, try to prove that a safecracker has been framed for a diamond robbery. Retitled "Las Vegas Roundabout" for syndication.

=== Season 1 (1975–76) ===
No. overall	No. in season	Title	Directed by	Written by	Original release date
1	1	"The James Caan Con"	E.W. Swackhamer	Richard Powell	September 9, 1975
Mac poses as a movie producer to get the goods on an actor who blackmails on the side.
2	2	"The Late Show Murders"	Douglas Heyes	Paul Playdon & David Chase	September 16, 1975
Pete and Mac borrow ideas from classic detective stories to thwart a crooked small-time private eye. They're decoying him from fencing stolen jewels by concocting a case he couldn't refuse.
3	3	"The Old Diamond Game"	Gordon Hessler	Glen A. Larson & Michael Sloan	September 23, 1975
In pursuit of a lawyer who made off with millions in a South American country, Pete and Mac head down to Rio to bring him back the old-fashioned way. Note: Sharon Gless does not appear in this episode.
4	4	"Stung from Beyond"	Jerry London	David Ketchum & Bruce Shelly	September 30, 1975
A group of con artists pull a con involving stock investors and their family.
5	5	"The Deadly Missiles Caper"	Walter Doniger	Glen A. Larson	October 7, 1975
Robin Morgan hires Pete and Mac to find her missing timber magnate father. She is convinced that her uncle is responsible. Note: Sharon Gless does not appear in this episode.
6	6	"The Man Who Couldn't Lose"	Bruce Kessler	Michael Kozoll	October 14, 1975
Pete and Mac play on a hijacker's weakness for gambling and women to find the location of the armored truck heist loot. Note: Sharon Gless does not appear in this episode.
7	7	"Death Heist"	Glen A. Larson	Eugene Cotton & Paul Shilling	October 21, 1975
Pete and Mac have only 11 days to get a jewel thief to produce a stolen emerald before the statute of limitations runs out on the crime.
8	8	"The Body at the Bottom"	E.W. Swackhamer	Story by : Rudolph Borchert; Teleplay by : Rudolph Borchert, Paul Playdon & David Chase	November 4, 1975
A ruthless businessman figures out an insurance scam: He sets his plant ablaze and lets an ex-con, who has been working there, serves as the fall guy. Mac and Pete must lead the crooked businessman to confess his deed.
9	9	"The Cruise Ship Murders"	Bruce Kessler	Story by : Charles Sailor & Eric Kaldor; Teleplay by : Mort Zarcoff, Charles Sailor & Eric Kaldor	November 11, 1975
Aboard a cruise ship Pete and Mac try to solve the mysterious death of a bookkeeper.
10	10	"Kiss of Death"	Allen Baron	Story by : Gregory S. Dinallo; Teleplay by : Gregory S. Dinallo, Glen A. Larson & Michael Kozoll	November 25, 1975
A feuding mob family becomes victim to an intruder.
11	11	"Death by Resurrection"	Alf Kjellin	Story by : John Thomas James; Teleplay by : Stephen J. Cannell	December 2, 1975
Pete and Mac are doing what they think is a routine background check when everyone — including the police, the FBI and the mob — want the check to stop immediately. The Writers Guild of America determined that the script for this episode was lifted from The Rockford Files episode "This Case Is Closed" broadcast the previous season (1974-75), and awarded writing credit solely to the two authors of that script (i.e., "John Thomas James" a.k.a. Roy Huggins, and Stephen J. Cannell).
12	12	"The Cold War Con"	John Peyser	Michael Kozoll	December 9, 1975
In order to rescue a model abducted by white slavers, Pete and Mac pretend that the girl is a valuable pawn in a struggle between Soviet and American agents.
13	13	"Through the Past Deadly"	John Peyser	Michael Kozoll	December 16, 1975
When someone attempts to take Pete's life, Mac recalls how their friendship came to happen.
14	14	"Mistresses, Murder and Millions"	Allen Baron	Story by : Paul Playdon; Teleplay by : David Chase	December 23, 1975
A business magnate involved in a hideous divorce is kidnapped, and the kidnappers later critically wound a police officer. Pete and Mac suspect that the man's soon-to-be ex-wife and his girlfriend may be behind the kidnapping — along with somebody else.
15	15	"The Walking Bomb"	John Peyser	Story by : David Ketchum & Bruce Shelly; Teleplay by : David Chase, David Ketchum & Bruce Shelly	January 6, 1976
Extortionists kidnap a bank executive and strap a bomb to his chest in order to force him to pay them a fortune. When the bank executive suffers a heart attack, they let him go — and strap the bomb to Pete Ryan instead.
16	16	"Ain't Nobody Here Named Barney"	John Newland	Michael Kozoll	January 13, 1976
A loony sculptor claims her grandfather wasn't really buried in his grave. It turns out he was, but there is also evidence that 4.3 million dollars in embezzled money is — or was — down there too. When Pete and Mac take up the case and find the money hijacked from a computer account, they also come upon a shadowy killer who is intent on making the sculptor look crazy or dead and taking them with her.
17	17	"Come Die with Me"	John Peyser	Bill Stratton	January 27, 1976
Pete is accused of the rape/murder of a stewardess who died after stumbling upon a plot to rob the Federal Reserve System; guest-starring Don Ho.
18	18	"One of Our Zeppelins Is Missing"	Dick Moder	Gene R. Kearney	February 10, 1976
A blackmailer (Joan Blondell) tries to frame Mac to avenge her husband's death in prison; guest-starring Dabney Coleman.
19	19	"Before the Holocaust"	Edward M. Abroms	David Chase	February 17, 1976
The death of a client's brother leads Pete and Mac to a protected mountain compound and a band of men planning to survive World War III.
20	20	"Big Deal in Paradise"	Bruce Kessler	Lou Shaw	February 24, 1976
Pete and Malcolm are suspected of stealing a million dollars of underworld money. Note: Sharon Gless does not appear in this episode.
21	21	"The Case of the Purloined Case"	John Peyser	Michael Kozoll	March 2, 1976
In Las Vegas, Pete and Mac hunt for a twice-stolen tote bag that a lot of shady people want, but for mysteriously different reasons.
22	22	"The Girl on the Golden Strip"	John Peyser	Glen A. Larson & David Chase	March 16, 1976
Unknown to himself, a Vegas nightclub singer turns into his alter ego, a deranged slasher-killer, when he hears one of his own classic songs. Pete and Mac get on the trail of the murderer but are sidelined by criminal activity on the parts of his managers. Filmed on location in Las Vegas and on Lake Mead.
23	23	"Round Up the Usual Suspects"	John Newland	Story by : Gene R. Kearney, David Ketchum & Tony DiMarco; Teleplay by : Gene R. Kearney	March 23, 1976
Pete and Mac travel to Casablanca to trick a syndicate kingpin (Ricardo Montalbán) who jailed an innocent American.
24	24	"Death Squad"	John Peyser	Lou Shaw	April 6, 1976
A wife comes to Pete when her estranged husband warns her that his involvement with a "death squad" has put her and their son in danger.

=== Season 2 (1976–77) ===
No. overall	No. in season	Title	Directed by	Written by	Original release date
25	1	"The Pirates of Tin Pan Alley"	David Impastato	Walter Dallenbach	September 21, 1976
The ex-wife of a DJ and her companion die mysteriously, and Mac and Pete start an investigation.
26	2	"The Twelfth Commandment"	Sutton Roley	Leigh Vance	September 28, 1976
A stolen attache case reveals a bundle of money and an apparent death note pinned to a picture of several priests.
27	3	"Fleece of Snow"	Leo Penn	Morton Fine	October 5, 1976
The police decline to investigate the supposed suicide of a detective, a suspected cocaine user.
28	4	"The Argonaut Special"	John Peyser	Walter Dallenbach	October 12, 1976
The manager of a ranch in which Mac has invested is being pressured to sell by a ruthless land speculator.
29	5	"The Things That Belong to Mickey Costello"	Sutton Roley	Shirl Hendryx	October 19, 1976
Mac goes after a singer whose alibi covers the thug responsible for the near-fatal beating of Pete.
30	6	"Whatever Happened to Carol Harmony?"	Ivan Dixon	Story by : David P. Lewis; Teleplay by : Leigh Vance	October 26, 1976
Pete and Mac are asked to look into the suspicious behavior of a well-loved movie star.
31	7	"Quicker Than the Eye"	David Friedkin	Sue Milburn	November 9, 1976
A peppery old con artist is marked for murder after witnessing a payoff.
32	8	"Gaffing the Skim"	Bruce Evans	Robert Dellinger	November 16, 1976
Pete poses as a carnival barker while investigating the abduction of a county-fair executive.
33	9	"The Lady from Liechtenstein: Part 1"	David Impastato	Norman Hudis	November 23, 1976
Impressionist Jim Bailey poses as a wealthy baroness to help Pete and Mac trap a womanizing crook.
34	10	"The Lady from Liechtenstein: Part 2"	David Impastato	Norman Hudis	November 30, 1976
A baroness is jeopardized by an announcement of the woman's marriage.
35	11	"Switch-Hitter"	Edward M. Abroms	Story by : Gene Thompson; Teleplay by : Arthur Rowe & Stephen Kandel	December 7, 1976
Pete and Mac pose as hit men after a reporter about to expose a union racket is an assassination-attempt victim.
36	12	"Maggie's Hero"	Noel Black	Edward J. Lakso	December 14, 1976
Pete and Mac try to clear Maggie's framed fiancé, even though they know he's a crook.
37	13	"The 100,000 Ruble Rumble"	Leo Penn	Morton Fine	December 21, 1976
Mac is framed for murder in an elaborate international swindle that also nets him a 100,000 ruble reward for the killing.
38	14	"Portraits of Death"	John Peyser	Shirl Hendryx	January 4, 1977
Acting only on a hunch and perhaps a bit of jealousy, Pete probes into the background of an old flame's fiancé, unaware that the man is a homicidal gigolo.
39	15	"The Snitch"	Sigmund Neufeld Jr.	Story by : Carey Wilber; Teleplay by : Carey Wilber & Jack Guss	January 16, 1977
Pete and Mac play mob bosses to learn who made an attempt on Malcolm's life.
40	16	"Eyewitness"	Leo Penn	Lewis Davidson	January 23, 1977
A blind music teacher hires Pete and Mac for protection after her presence at a murder is noted by the killer.
41	17	"Camera Angles"	Bruce Kessler	David Taylor	January 30, 1977
To help a friend — and without telling each other — Mac and Pete tackle a case involving murder, kidnapping and a revolutionary new camera.
42	18	"Butterfly Mourning"	Sutton Roley	Robert Earll & Alan Godfrey	February 6, 1977
Mac and Pete search for the killer of Mac's pilot friend, who died after flying back from Mexico.
43	19	"The Four Horsemen"	Sigmund Neufeld Jr.	Michael Wagner	February 13, 1977
Maggie is abducted by a mobster to ensure that Pete and Mac find whoever killed his father's buddy, and who likely has similar plans for Papa.
44	20	"Eden's Gate"	Gerald Mayer	Story by : David Taylor; Teleplay by : Robert Earll	February 20, 1977
Pete investigates a posh spa that cures its wealthy clients of drinking and overeating by killing them; guest-starring June Allyson.
45	21	"The Hemline Heist"	Leo Penn	Jack Guss	February 27, 1977
A fashion designer is murdered three times simultaneously during a fashion show: he drinks cyanide-laced champagne, gets shot, and has a spotlight tumble onto his head all at once. The rest of the episode is shown in flashbacks, as the story unfolds of how people stole the formula for his latest show-stopping fashion and tried — independently of each other but at the exact same moment — to kill him for trying to find out who did it.
46	22	"Three for the Money"	Sigmund Neufeld Jr.	Stephen Kandel	March 6, 1977
Pete and Mac are invited to settle a racketeer's estate, a substantial legacy left to the three women in his life but coveted by his former partner, a sadistic loan shark.
47	23	"Two on the Run"	Arnold Laven	Cynthia A. Cherbak	March 13, 1977
Pete is asked by a former fellow inmate to locate a dancer who can clear him of murder charges.
48	24	"Heritage of Death"	John Peyser	Larry Forrester	April 3, 1977
An unidentified four-year-old African boy is left at Malcolm's doorstep, along with a note warning that the child needs protection.

=== Season 3 (1977–78) ===
No. overall	No. in season	Title	Directed by	Written by	Original release date
49	1	"Net Loss"	Reza Badiyi	Stephen Kandel	September 23, 1977
Pete and Mac are hired by a murdered tennis pro's coach, who fears someone is trying to kill off the entire team.
50	2	"Downshift"	Sigmund Neufeld Jr.	Robert Earll	September 30, 1977
A mechanic hires Mac and Pete to prove that the mysterious death of a top race-car driver was actually murder; guest-starring Morgan Fairchild.
51	3	"Fade Out"	Lawrence Doheny	Richard H. Landau	October 14, 1977
Pete and Mac are hired by the producer of a movie after the film's leading lady has her life threatened.
52	4	"Legend of the Macunas: Part 1"	John Peyser	Leigh Vance	October 21, 1977
A Las Vegas pilot crashes in the desert on a photo shoot, and Mac and Pete look into the cause.
53	5	"Legend of the Macunas: Part 2"	John Peyser	Leigh Vance	October 21, 1977
Conclusion to the case of the missing pilot and the search for buried treasure.
54	6	"Dancer"	Paul Krasny	Patrick Mathews	December 5, 1977
Pete and Mac do a literal song and dance as they help an old vaudeville hoofer try to figure out who took several shots at him onstage, killing his dance partner.
55	7	"Go for Broke"	Sigmund Neufeld Jr.	Mel Goldberg & Chris Lucky	December 12, 1977
Pete and Mac are hired by a wealthy woman to locate her missing husband, a philanderer with a gambling problem. But the woman is murdered before they find her husband.
56	8	"Lady of the Deep"	Sigmund Neufeld Jr.	Larry Forrester	December 19, 1977
A marine biologist has disappeared along the coast of Mexico while engaged in a salvage operation for the government.
57	9	"Thirty Thousand Witnesses"	Fernando Lamas	Tom Bagen	December 26, 1977
When a soccer team's star player is murdered, Pete poses as a goalkeeper and Mac masquerades as a trainer in hopes of drawing out the killer.
58	10	"Dangerous Curves"	Phil Bondelli	Larry Forrester	January 2, 1978
An all-woman cab company has been bombed and their drivers mugged, so they hire Mac and Pete to find out who and why.
59	11	"The Tong"	Ray Danton	David Carren & Peter Allan Fields	January 9, 1978
Malcolm's cook is involved in a murder that may presage war among Chinese clans.
60	12	"Who Killed Lila Craig?"	Paul Krasny	Steve Fisher	January 16, 1978
Mac becomes one of his own clients when he becomes a suspect in a 20-year old unsolved murder.
61	13	"The Cage"	Phil Bondelli	Larry Forrester & Patrick Mathews	June 25, 1978
A zoo's veterinarian has mysteriously disappeared and the only clue may have to do with a rare white rhino.
62	14	"Coronado Circle"	Michael Caffey	Donald P. Bellisario	July 2, 1978
An elderly captain and his deckhand are missing from a yacht found drifting where several vessels recently disappeared.
63	15	"Blue Crusaders Reunion"	Seymour Robbie	Robert Earll & Leigh Vance	July 9, 1978
Mac and Pete bargain for the life of a girl held hostage by gunmen at a police officers' reunion.
64	16	"Stolen Island"	Fernando Lamas	Robert Earll	July 16, 1978
Mac and Pete go under cover to determine who is responsible for a series of mishaps at the construction site of a luxurious island hotel.
65	17	"Play-Off"	Sigmund Neufeld Jr.	Larry Forrester	July 23, 1978
A gambling mogul kidnaps Malcolm to ensure that Pete will protect his golfer son.
66	18	"Mexican Standoff"	Fernando Lamas	John Lewis Figueroa & Larry Forrester	July 30, 1978
Pete and Mac investigate white-slavers who smuggle aliens from Latin America.
67	19	"Three Blonde Mice"	James Sheldon	Michael Wagner	August 6, 1978
Some interesting underwater footage highlights this episode as Pete and Mac, in full business suits, dive into a swimming pool to defuse a nuclear bomb threatening to take out a society party and much of Los Angeles to boot.
68	20	"The Siege at the Bouziki Bar"	Seymour Robbie	Larry Forrester & John Peyser	August 13, 1978
The mob sends hitmen after a pregnant woman who can testify against them, and she takes refuge in Malcolm's bar while Pete, Maggie, and Mac are there.
69	21	"Formula for Murder"	Sigmund Neufeld Jr.	Madeline Di Maggio & Kathy Donnell	August 20, 1978
Pete and Mac are separately hired by feuding sisters to find a stolen formula and the killer of the women's father; guest-starring Macdonald Carey.
70	22	"Photo Finish"	Ray Danton	Cynthia A. Cherbak	August 27, 1978
An airline stewardess asks Pete and Mac to locate her sister, a militant ecologist, who went into hiding following a chemical-company bombing.
