= La Cage aux Folles =

La Cage aux Folles may refer to:

- La Cage aux Folles (play), 1973 French play
- La Cage aux Folles (film), 1978 French-Italian film adapted from the play
  - La Cage aux Folles II, 1980 sequel
  - La Cage aux Folles 3: 'Elles' se marient, 1985 sequel
- La Cage aux Folles (musical), 1983 musical adapted from the play

== See also ==
- The Birdcage, 1996 American film adapted from the play
- La Cage (disambiguation)
