= La Cage =

La Cage may include:

- La Cage (film) or The Cage, a 1963 French film
- "La Cage" (song), a song by Jean Michel Jarre
- La Cage (English: The Cage) a 2024 French television series directed by Franck Gastambide

== See also ==
- La Cage aux Folles (disambiguation), often shortened to La Cage
- The Cage (disambiguation)
