= The Glass Cage =

The Glass Cage may refer to:

- The Glass Cage (1955 film), a British crime film
- The Glass Cage (play), 1957 play by J. B. Priestley
- The Glass Cage (1961 film), directed by Antonio Santean, starring John Hoyt and Elisha Cook
- The Glass Cage (1965 film), an Israeli-French film
- "The Glass Cage" (Mission Impossible episode)
- The Glass Cage (novel), a 1971 novel by Georges Simenon
- The Glass Cage: Automation and Us, a 2014 book by Nicholas G. Carr
