= William Cage =

William Cage may refer to:

- William Cage (MP for Rochester) (1666–1738)
- William Cage (MP for Ipswich) (died 1645)
- William Cage (Tennessee politician) (1745–1811)
- William "Bill" Cage, character in All You Need is Kill
