= Ballot Security Task Force =

1981 US voter intimidation group

The National Ballot Security Task Force (BSTF) was founded in 1981 in New Jersey, United States, by the Republican National Committee (RNC) to discourage voter turnout among likely Democratic voters in the gubernatorial election.

The group's activities prompted the Democratic National Committee (DNC) to bring a federal lawsuit, alleging a violation of the Voting Rights Act, illegal harassment, and voter intimidation. The RNC and New Jersey Republican State Committee entered into a consent decree in 1982, barring them from engaging in further such conduct.

The RNC tried to lift the consent decree several times over the next 25 years; these attempts were rejected by the federal courts. In 2009, the US District Court of New Jersey agreed to several modifications of the consent decree, including the addition of an expiration date. That date was set for December 1, 2017. Democrats sought an extension of the consent decree based on allegations of new conduct, but the request was denied in January 2018 and the decree expired.

== Overview ==
The task force consisted of a group of armed, off-duty police officers wearing armbands, who were hired to patrol polling sites in African-American and Hispanic neighborhoods of Newark and Trenton.

Initially, 45,000 letters were mailed (using an outdated voter registration list) to primarily Latino and African-American citizens. Many of these letters were later returned as non-deliverable, and the 45,000 addresses were used to create a list of voters. These voters were then challenged by the BSTF, a practice known as voter caging.

In addition, the Republican National Committee filed a request for election supervisors to strike these voters from the rolls, but the commissioners of registration refused when they discovered that the RNC had used outdated information.

On New Jersey's election day in 1981, the BSTF posted large signs, without identification but with an official appearance, reading

WARNING

THIS AREA IS BEING PATROLLED BY THE
NATIONAL BALLOT
SECURITY TASK FORCE
IT IS A CRIME TO FALSIFY A BALLOT OR

TO VIOLATE ELECTION LAWS

Armed members of the Task Force "were drawn from the ranks of off-duty county deputy sheriffs and local police," who "prominently displayed revolvers, two-way radios, and BSTF armbands." BSTF patrols "challenged and questioned voters at the polls and blocked the way of some prospective voters" in predominantly African-American and Hispanic areas. Democrat James J. Florio lost the gubernatorial election to Republican Thomas H. Kean by 1,797 votes.

== 1982 lawsuit and consent decree ==
A civil lawsuit was filed after the election by the DNC, which alleged that the RNC had violated the Voting Rights Act and engaged in illegal harassment and voter intimidation. The suit was settled in 1982, when the Republican National Committee and New Jersey Republican State Committee, instead of a trial, signed a consent decree in U.S. District Court saying that they would not allow tactics that could intimidate Democratic voters, though they did not admit any wrongdoing. The case and ensuing decree were supervised by District Court Judge Dickinson R. Debevoise for the ensuing 34 years.

The consent decree, entered on November 1, 1982, prevented the Republican Party "from engaging in activities that suppress the vote, particularly when it comes to minority voters." It also barred the wearing of armbands at polling places. Under the consent decree "the Republican party organizations agreed to allow a federal court to review proposed 'ballot security' programs, including any proposed voter caging." The consent decree expired in December 2017. A successor consent decree, applying to several states, was entered on July 27, 1987.

== Republican attempts to lift consent decree ==
Prior to the expiration of the decree in 2018, the Republican Party attempted several times, without success, to have it terminated. They argued that it was "antiquated" and unnecessary. The Democratic National Committee countered by arguing that "recent campaigns show the 'consent degree remains necessary today.'" In 2009, a New Jersey federal judge rejected the RNC's request to vacate the consent decree. This ruling was unanimously affirmed by the U.S. Court of Appeals for the Third Circuit in 2012. The Supreme Court declined to hear the RNC's appeal in 2013.

== 2016 motion ==
On October 26, 2016, the DNC filed a motion asking the U.S. District Court for the District of New Jersey to find that the RNC had violated the consent decree. The motion was filed after the campaign of Republican presidential nominee Donald Trump suggested, without evidence, that the election was "rigged" in favor of his opponent Hillary Clinton and urged Trump supporters to watch the polls to combat supposed "voter fraud." The DNC also sought to extend the duration of the consent decree. A shortened discovery occurred, and on November 5 the court denied the request. The court determined that the DNC did not present "sufficient evidence of coordination between the Trump campaign and the RNC on ballot-security operations" but did "allow the DNC to offer further evidence after the election."

== Expiration of consent decree ==
The consent decree restricting Republican Party conduct was set to expire on December 1, 2017, but Democrats sought an extension, alleging that statements from Donald Trump campaign officials showed the RNC had engaged in activities in violation of the decree. U.S. District Judge John Michael Vazquez allowed the Democratic Party to take the deposition of Sean Spicer before issuing a decision on whether the decree should be allowed to expire, but denied Democrats' motions for hearings on the issue. On January 8, Judge John Vasquez ruled that the decree had expired on December 1, and would not be extended.

The 2020 presidential election was the first presidential election since 1980 in which the Republican Party was able to deploy "ballot security operations". In 2019 Justin R. Clark, an official in Trump's re-election campaign, was recorded telling Republican lawyers that the expiration of the consent decree was a "huge, huge, huge, huge deal" for the campaign's election day operations in Wisconsin. In March 2020 the RNC announced plans to mobilize 50,000 poll watchers to swing states, while Trump described plans to mobilise law enforcement as poll watchers, and the True the Vote group sought to recruit police officers and military veterans. The political scientist Kenneth Mayer of the University of Wisconsin–Madison argued in August 2020 that the lifting of the consent decree raised the prospect of a return to practices of voter intimidation, while Justin Levitt of Loyola Law School argued that the RNC was unlikely to have the capacity to mobilize such numbers. In October 2020 the Trump campaign said it had enlisted more than 50,000 volunteer poll watchers in swing states. In a September 2020 opinion column, Florio likened Trump's rhetoric to the use of voter intimidation in the 1981 campaign.

== See also ==
- Corruption in the United States
- Election subversion § United States
- Voter suppression in the United States
