= The Gilded Cage =

The Gilded Cage may refer to:

== Film and television ==
- The Gilded Cage (1916 film), a silent film drama
- The Gilded Cage (1955 film), a British crime film
- The Gilded Cage (2013 film), a French-Portuguese comedy film
- "The Gilded Cage" (The Avengers), a television episode

== Paintings ==
- The Gilded Cage (De Morgan), a 1901-1902 painting by English painter Evelyn De Morgan
- The Gilded Cage (Hare), a 1908 painting by Irish artist Saint George Hare

== Other uses ==
- The Gilded Cage (novel) (Swedish: En bur av guld ), a 2019 Swedish novel by Camilla Läckberg (also titled The Golden Cage)

== See also ==
- "A Bird in a Gilded Cage", a 1900 song
