= Metaphorical extension =

A metaphorical extension is the "extension of meaning in a new direction" through the popular adoption of an original metaphorical comparison.

The metaphorical extension is almost a universal and natural process in any language undergone by every word. In general, it's not even perceived in everyday usage as meaning change. When it is least obvious, users don't even see it as extending the meaning of a word. Consider the example of illuminate: it originally meant "to light up" something dim or dark, but has evolved to mean "to clarify", or "to edify". After a while, these new meanings seem so natural as to be integral parts of the word, whereas senses such as "to celebrate" and "to adorn a page with designs" seem like more obvious additions.

== Radiation ==
According to linguist Jeffrey Henning:

Radiation is a metaphorical extension on a grander scale, with new meanings radiating from a central semantic core to embrace many related ideas. The word head originally referred to that part of the human body above the rest. Since the top of a nail, pin or screw is, like the human head, the top of a slim outline, that sense has become included in the meaning of head. Since the bulb of a cabbage or lettuce is round like the human head, that sense has become included in the meaning of head. Know where I'm headed with this? The meaning of the word head has radiated out to include the head of a coin (the side picturing the human head), the head of the list (the top item in the list), the head of a table, the head of the family, a head of cattle, $50 a head.

Other words that have similarly radiated meanings outward from a central core include the words fire, root and sun.

== Examples ==
A crane at a construction site was given its name by comparison to the long-necked bird of the same name. When the meaning of the word daughter was first extended from that of "one's female child" to "a female descendant" (as in daughter of Eve), the listener might not have even noticed that the meaning had been extended.

The late Admiral, mathematician, and computer pioneer, Grace Murray Hopper, frequently repeated a favorite amusing story in front of many audiences about an early computer that experienced an episode where it kept calculating incorrectly. When technicians examined the machine's hardwired logic (the wiring, in the World War II era computer), a huge moth was discovered such that its body was shorting out one of the vacuum tube and relay circuits and causing the repetitive fault, and so may have played a key role in popularizing the term which was in use in hardware engineering from at least Edison's time (see Computer bug#Etymology). Since the Admiral's speeches, both hardware faults and software errors are now routinely referred to as "bugs", and getting the flaws out of a product is known as 'debugging' the system. Her team almost certainly coined the latter term. A particular type of software program designed to aid software development is known as a "debugger" complements the program known as a compiler, the first of which was developed by G.M. Hopper.

The use of bug to refer to a computer error in logic was a metaphorical extension that has become so popular that it is now part of the regular meaning of "bug". The computer industry has a host of words whose meaning has been extended through such metaphors, including "mouse" for possessing a 'tail' similar to said rodent now used widely for these computer input devices—even though the more modern Wireless ones have lost the metaphorical tail entirely.

== See also ==
- Pataphor
- Extended metaphor
