= Caging (direct mail) =

A caging list, in the direct mail industry, is a list or database of addresses that is updated after a mailing program is completed, with notations on responses and corrections for addresses whose mail has been returned as undeliverable or has been forwarded.

In third-party direct mail fundraising, a caging agent receives contributions, processes donor mail and "deposits all contributions to the client's account" according to Eberle Associates, a US direct mail and political fundraising firm.

The Association of Fundraising Professionals similarly defines caging as "the process or act of collecting donations by an entity other than the not-for-profit organization for which they were solicited."

Often, the processing of responses to direct mail is conducted by a third party hired to perform various services, which may include processing payments, compiling product orders, correcting recipient addresses, processing returned mail, providing lockbox services, and depositing funds and the associated data processing for each of these services. Caging is a shorthand term for the service bundle. The term may be a derivative of the financial teller cage since operations related to lockbox services involve the control and protection of funds.

The personal information gathered about respondents may be even more valuable than the donations received or purchases made. Mal Warwick Associates explains that "caging" allows an organization to exploit "information that can be gleaned" from a direct mail campaign: "Information from the caging process is often massaged and manipulated six ways from Sunday, all in hopes of finding a productive new mailing list, marginally improving a letter's results, or cutting its cost by a few pennies."

Direct Magazine adds that caging is also called "secure response management." The quality of response data and how the data might be used are directly proportional to pre-mail planning, which includes labor-saving devices like matched barcodes and other methods for "all digital workflow."
