= 2000 Mules =

2022 American film by Dinesh D'Souza

- Theatrical release poster
- Directed by: Dinesh D'Souza; Debbie D'Souza; Bruce Schooley
- Written by: Dinesh D'Souza; Debbie D'Souza; Bruce Schooley
- Produced by: Dinesh D'Souza; Gregg Phillips; Catherine Englebrecht
- Starring: Dinesh D'Souza
- Narrated by: Dinesh D'Souza
- Edited by: Dinesh D'Souza
- Music by: Bryan E. Miller
- Production companies: D'Souza Media; Salem Media Group
- Distributed by: D'Souza Media
- Release date: May 20, 2022
- Running time: 89 minutes
- Country: United States
- Language: English
- Box office: $1.5 million

2000 Mules is a 2022 American right-wing conspiracy propaganda film which makes debunked claims that paid "mules" illegally collected and deposited ballots into drop boxes in swing states during the 2020 presidential election. The film was written, directed, produced, and narrated by right-wing political commentator and filmmaker Dinesh D'Souza, who has a history of creating and spreading false conspiracy theories.

The Associated Press (AP) reported that the film relies on "faulty assumptions, anonymous accounts and improper analysis of cellphone location data" provided by conservative non-profit True the Vote. FactCheck.org found the film's "supposed evidence is speculative". National Public Radio (NPR) reported True the Vote "made multiple misleading or false claims about its [own] work". AP reported that the assertion that True the Vote identified 1,155 paid mules in Philadelphia alone was false. The film presented a single unverified anonymous witness who said she saw people picking up what she "assumed" were payments for ballot collection in Arizona; no evidence of such payments was presented in any of the other four states. The film characterizes the alleged operation as "ballot trafficking" with "stash houses", but presents no evidence that ballots were illegally collected to be deposited in drop boxes.

A companion book was set to be released in early September 2022 but was abruptly recalled amidst legal threats and edited for release late in October. In 2024, Salem Media Group partially settled a lawsuit by a Georgia man who had been falsely accused of depositing fraudulent ballots in a ballot box. As part of the settlement, Salem disavowed the film and the book, pulled them from distribution and apologized.

== Content and methodology ==
2000 Mules opens with a misleadingly edited clip from October 2020 of then-presidential candidate Joe Biden responding to a podcaster's question about boosting his election turnout. After replying, "Republicans are doing everything they can to make it harder for people to vote, especially people of color to vote", Biden added, "we have put together I think the most extensive and inclusive voter fraud organization in the history of American politics." His second statement was taken out of context in clips and memes that went viral on conservative media at the time, purporting to be an admission that Democrats were preparing to commit election fraud. This was debunked at the time, as Biden was actually referring to safeguarding the vote, later adding, "What [Trump] is trying to do is discourage people from voting by implying that their vote won't be counted, it can't be counted, we're going to challenge it and all these things."

The film relies on data provided by True the Vote. According to NPR, "A conservative 'election integrity' group called True The Vote has made multiple misleading or false claims about its [own] work, NPR has found, including the suggestion that they helped solve the murder of an eight-year-old girl in Atlanta. The claims appear in a new pro-Trump film called 2,000 Mules." NPR said that True the Vote's claim that it "solved a murder of a young little girl in Atlanta" was false.

Analysis conducted by the AP found the film was "based on faulty assumptions, anonymous accounts and improper analysis of cellphone location data". AP explained that in various swing counties across the five states, True the Vote used phone pings to cellphone towers to identify people who had passed near ballot drop boxes and various unnamed nonprofit organizations multiple times per day, concluding that such people were paid mules for ballot collection and deposits. Experts said such mobile phone tracking was not accurate enough to distinguish alleged mules from many other people who might walk or drive by a ballot box or nonprofit during the course of a day, such as delivery drivers, postal workers and cab drivers. True the Vote asserted it had conducted "pattern of life" filtering of such people before election season; the AP noted limitations of that approach.

The film also asserts that some of the geolocated alleged mules were present at what it called "antifa riots" in Atlanta during the George Floyd protests in spring 2020. AP explained that the geolocation data could not reliably determine why people were present at that event; they could have been peaceful protesters, police or firefighters responding to the protests, or business owners in the area. The geolocation data True the Vote had purchased began on October 1, 2020. D'Souza and Gregg Phillips, a True the Vote board member, asserted they had matched their geolocation data with data from the Armed Conflict Location and Event Data Project (ACLED). In the film, Phillips claims that "dozens and dozens and dozens of our mules show up on the ACLED databases" as what are characterized as "antifa rioters". ACLED said the claims were categorically false, noting it does not track cellphone data. True the Vote's leader Catherine Engelbrecht asserted Phillips was actually referring to a different organization, then mentioned ACLED, but she declined to name the different organization, saying Phillips relied on "multiple databases".

To illustrate the use of phone geolocation technology, in the film D'Souza speaks with Phillips, who alleges he used it to identify two suspects in an Atlanta homicide cold case, providing his analysis to the FBI, which he and D'Souza suggest resulted in arrests of the suspects. The homicide was not a cold case, and both suspects were arrested by state rather than federal officials, with no indication phone geolocation played a role. True the Vote stated days after 2000 Mules was released that it had notified the FBI of its analysis more than two months after the suspects had been indicted. Promoting the film on his podcast, D'Souza said the FBI had forwarded the information to the Georgia Bureau of Investigation (GBI) and the arrests resulted shortly thereafter; the GBI denied receiving such information. NPR was unable to confirm that True the Vote had provided analysis to the FBI; Engelbrecht told NPR she would not provide names of any FBI agents she claimed to have contacted "as I do not want them harassed". Phillips had previously claimed without evidence that non-citizens illegally cast as many as five million ballots in the 2016 elections.

The film likened its geolocation methodology to that used by federal investigators to identify individuals inside the U.S. Capitol during the January 6 attack, showing an image of individuals at the centers of large circles of uncertainty, fully within the building, to show they were there. But similar large circles of uncertainly would be insufficient to show someone was at, rather than near, a ballot drop box.

In the film, Phillips shows a diagram on a tablet computer purporting to show a mule traveling to 28 drop boxes in Atlanta. When that diagram is superimposed over a diagram of actual drop box locations, only some of the purported locations are near actual drop boxes. Phillips told The Washington Post that "the movie graphics are not literal interpretations of our data". Another diagram in the film purports to show geolocations superimposed over a map of Atlanta, but the map is actually of Moscow.

The film shows surveillance video of people allegedly depositing multiple ballots into drop boxes, although there was no way to match them with the geolocation data, and most states allow such ballot collection on behalf of family members and household members. In one segment, Phillips narrates that a woman deposited "a small stack" of ballots into a drop box, although it is not actually clear there was more than one ballot. The deposit allegedly occurred at 1am, after which the woman removed latex gloves and threw them away, which the film characterizes as suspicious. The incident occurred on January 5, 2021, during Georgia's runoff election, not during the 2020 presidential election. The film alleges that some of those captured in surveillance videos were wearing gloves to avoid leaving their fingerprints on ballots, but the videos are from the fall and winter of 2020, when people were taking precautions during the COVID-19 pandemic.

Phillips narrates a surveillance video in which a man on a bicycle rides up to a drop box and deposits his ballot. Phillips characterizes the man as "sort of frustrated as he starts to leave", although there is no obvious evidence of frustration, supposedly because the man had forgotten to photograph himself depositing the ballot. Phillips speculated, "they had started requiring the mules, apparently, to take pictures of the stuffing of the ballots. It appears that that's how they get paid." The man later took a photo of his bicycle next to the drop box, leading Catherine Engelbrecht of True the Vote to ask, "If you're just casting your own ballot, what reason in the world would you have to come back and take a picture of the box?". Elections officials had encouraged voters to share their experiences on social media to boost turnout; images posted on social media included people depositing ballots at that particular drop box.

Georgia Secretary of State Brad Raffensperger said his office investigated a surveillance video from the film showing a man depositing five ballots into a drop box, finding he had lawfully deposited ballots for himself and his family. It was one of at least three surveillance videos from the film found by Georgia investigators to show lawful depositing of multiple ballots.

2000 Mules does not inform viewers that, even if the events it depicts occurred, every absentee ballot deposited in a drop box must be inside an envelope sent to each registered voter that includes the voter's registration information, signature, and a barcode for verification. Ballots lacking the envelope are rejected. True the Vote did not assert any of the ballots involved in the alleged mule scheme were illegal, although in the film D'Souza falsely asserts the Georgia man depositing multiple ballots for himself and his family was committing a "crime" with "fraudulent" ballots. In an interview with Philip Bump of The Washington Post, D'Souza asserted that, despite not having shown there was any illegal ballot trafficking operation, any ballot delivered by such a process would therefore be invalid. The Republican chairman of the Georgia election board explained that a valid ballot remains so regardless of how it was received.

AP reported that the film's assertion that True the Vote identified 1,155 paid mules in Philadelphia alone was false. The film presents a single anonymous witness who says she saw people picking up what she "assumed" were payments for ballot collection in Arizona; no evidence of payments was presented in any of the other four states. Engelbrecht states in the film that according to unidentified "people who have shared information with us, it’s generally $10 a ballot" for what is characterized as "ballot trafficking" through "stash houses", but the film presents no evidence that ballots were collected from a nonprofit to be deposited in drop boxes. The film speculates that nonprofits acquired ballots from voters who had moved or died, by stealing them from mailboxes, or by coercion of incapacitated elderly people. None of the surveillance videos in the film show anyone dropping off ballots more than once. True the Vote claims about video of multiple drops by an individual, "Some of that footage was shown in the first trailer. It was taken out because the video is extremely poor quality."

D'Souza asserted as many as 400,000 ballots may have been involved, "more than enough to tip the balance in the 2020 presidential election", although True the Vote did not allege any of the ballots were illegal.

The film shows a supercut of news clips after election day saying the results had changed from the night before. D'Souza describes what he and others consider suspicious the fact that Trump was leading in some key states early on election night, only for Biden to win the states by the next morning. This is attributable to a phenomenon known as blue shift, or red mirage: Republicans have a greater tendency to vote in person and their ballots are counted early, while Democrats have a greater tendency to vote by absentee ballots, which are counted later. This disparity was more pronounced in the 2020 election because Trump had spent months discouraging his supporters from voting by absentee ballot, which in some cases resulted in expected large jumps in Biden votes as absentee ballots were counted overnight.

The last third of the film consists of a panel discussion among several conservative and right-wing pundits, all of whom have shows with conservative outlet Salem Media Group, which was an executive producer of the film.

Phillips said in an interview with right-wing activist Charlie Kirk, one of the panelists in the film, that it took "12 people 16 hours a day for 15 months" to conduct their data analysis. Phillips said part of the analysis was conducted at the High Performance Computing Collaboratory at Mississippi State University. A university spokesman said he was not aware of any such analysis conducted there, noting Phillips had taken a publicly available tour and leased office space in a separate building in the same research park that "appeared to us to be sporadically used, if at all".

The film conflates with its premise a case involving unlawful ballot collection by two Yuma County, Arizona, women during the August 2020 primary elections; the women had collected ballots for others, although they were not family members or caregivers as required by law, and their prosecutions were underway before the film's release. D'Souza said during a podcast that the Yuma County sheriff saw the film, "went berserk and has opened up an investigation" and, "I believe there will be arrests very soon." The sheriff denied the claim, saying he had been investigating a variety of alleged voter misconduct issues for over a year, none of which were related to the film's claims. D'Souza later claimed that these two women pleaded guilty after having watched 2000 Mules. In fact, this was impossible, as Alma Juarez pleaded guilty on January 18, 2022, and Guillerma Fuentes pleaded guilty on April 11, 2022, before the film's first screenings in May.

Trump ally Patrick Byrne, who financially backed the Maricopa County, Arizona ballot audit that attempted but failed to find 2020 voting fraud in the county, also falsely said the Yuma investigation was in direct response to the film.

True the Vote did not cooperate with investigations by Georgia election officials, refusing to disclose the names of people who allegedly collected ballots. The State Election Board issued subpoenas to the organization in April 2022, seeking documents, recordings and names of individuals involved; the Board sued the organization in July 2023 for failure to comply with the subpoenas. The GBI examined the True the Vote allegations in fall 2021 but did not find sufficient evidence to open an investigation. In a letter to True the Vote, the bureau noted that the data it was provided counted a "visit" to a drop box as extending to a radius of 100 feet (30 m). The GBI letter also mentioned that it was given cell site location information (CSLI), which is far less accurate than GPS data; GPS was not mentioned in the letter. D'Souza told the Post that True the Vote "did not exclusively use CSLI data" and that they told him the GBI had misrepresented the data. The Atlanta Journal-Constitution reported in February 2024 that True the Vote said in a filing with the Fulton County Superior Court in response to the Election Board lawsuit that, "it doesn’t have documents about illegal ballot collection, the name of its purported informant or confidentiality agreements it previously said existed."

In October 2022, the office of Republican Arizona attorney general Mark Brnovich referred True the Vote to the FBI and IRS for possible investigation, finding that Engelbrecht and Phillips had falsely told the office they had given their data to the Phoenix FBI office and were working as informants there, while telling the FBI office, the Arizona Senate and the public they had given their data to the attorney general's office, although they had not. Brnovich's office said True the Vote claimed to have evidence of 243 mules in Arizona, but presented no proof. The attorney general's office also suggested True the Vote's tax exempt nonprofit status should be examined.

== Reception ==
In the first day of its release, the film earned $300,000, making it the second-highest grossing documentary to date in 2022. According to executive producer Salem Media, it grossed $10 million in revenue in the first two weeks of independent and streaming release, with over one million viewers. Salem said its net revenue makes it the most profitable political documentary in a decade. It earned $163,331 in its second weekend, and $50,696 in its third.

Former president Donald Trump, who has routinely and falsely claimed that he was the true winner of the 2020 election, praised the film as the "greatest [and] most impactful documentary of our time" and as supposedly exposing "great election fraud", and arranged for a screening to be held at his Mar-a-Lago resort on May 4; the screening was attended by various people affiliated with the American right, some of whom (Rudy Giuliani, Mike Lindell, and Marjorie Taylor Greene, among others) have also promoted the false claim that the 2020 election was stolen from Trump. In his twelve-page rebuttal to testimony and evidence that was presented in public hearings by the United States House Select Committee on the January 6 Attack, Trump cited the movie in one of its sections that focused on "ballot trafficking" claims.

Media outlets such as PolitiFact, the Associated Press and The Washington Post criticized the film for its factual errors and omissions, making implausible claims, and promoting conspiracy theories about the supposed theft of the 2020 presidential election. The Post characterized the film as presenting "the least convincing election-fraud theory yet".

Writing in The Bulwark, Republican author and political advisor Amanda Carpenter characterized 2000 Mules as "a hilarious mockumentary" that "doesn't survive the most basic fact-checks to support its most important claims". Conservative commentator Ben Shapiro of The Daily Wire said, "I think the conclusion of the film is not justified by the premises of the film itself. There are a bunch of dots that need to be connected. Maybe they will be connected, but they haven't been connected in the film." The Dispatch, a conservative publication, wrote that "The film's ballot harvesting theory is full of holes" and that, "D'Souza has a history of promoting false and misleading claims." Philip Bump summarized a discussion with D'Souza as, "D'Souza admits his movie does not show evidence to prove his claims about ballots being collected and submitted."

=== Further response ===
On May 9, 2022, D'Souza criticized Fox News and Newsmax for not promoting the film, claiming that Fox News' Tucker Carlson instructed Engelbrecht not to mention it during his interview with her and that Newsmax had originally booked an interview with D'Souza but then canceled. Trump later made similar criticisms, claiming that "Fox News is no longer Fox News" due to not showing or discussing the film, and that the outlet's silence was pleasing to what he called "Radical Left Democrats".

On May 19, The Daily Beast reported that D'Souza continued to be frustrated that his film was not receiving much attention outside of an "election-denier movement" that already believed in Trump's false claims of a stolen election, with the movement's adherents demanding that conservative media outlets talk more about the film. Conservative talk radio host Jesse Kelly, responding to ever-increasing requests that he discuss the film on his radio show, dismissed those making such requests as "talk about 2000 Mules guys" and "the bottom of the barrel". 2000 Mules was initially available online for $29.99 until D'Souza lowered the price to $19.99 within days of its release. He alleged the film was being widely pirated and that someone who attended the Mar-a-Lago screening had recorded it. Kari Lake, a Trump-endorsed Arizona gubernatorial candidate who embraced the film, said she was "flabbergasted" that she had not been asked about it during an interview with a conservative network; Lake did not specify the network.

Eight Arizona Republican officials held a meeting with about 200 others to hear a presentation from Phillips and Engelbrecht weeks after the film's release. Phillips called the press "journalistic terrorists" for demonstrating the film's lack of proof. Asked if he had turned over evidence to law enforcement, Phillips said he had given data to the Arizona attorney general's office a year earlier; the office said they never received it. He declined to discuss specifics of the film's methodology, saying it was proprietary. Engelbrecht declined to name any of the nonprofits allegedly involved, asserting that doing so would interfere with law enforcement.

The editorial board of the New York Post, a conservative tabloid that endorsed Trump in 2020, published an editorial on June 10, 2022, stating Trump, "clings to more fantastical theories, such as Dinesh D'Souza's debunked '2,000 Mules', even as recounts in Arizona, Georgia and Wisconsin confirm Trump lost."

Bill Barr, Trump's attorney general during the 2020 election, announced on December 1, 2020, that the Justice Department and FBI had investigated allegations of election fraud but found nothing significant. In June 2022 testimony to the House Select Committee on the January 6 Attack, Barr laughed at the mention of 2000 Mules, and when asked to assess it, dismissed its assertions there had been widespread election fraud, calling the movie "indefensible".

Jeffrey Clark, a former Trump Justice Department official who was the central figure in a Trump scheme to install Clark as acting attorney general to announce falsely that the department had found election fraud, promoted 2000 Mules while taunting law professor Steve Vladeck and Democratic elections attorney Marc Elias on Twitter. He asked Elias, who had thwarted every lawsuit Trump's legal team had pursued after the election, "Were you part of the massive multi-State operation #TrueTheVote uncovered?"

Three screenings were held during the Republican Party of Texas's June 2022 convention, which saw attendees approve a resolution falsely describing Biden's victory in the 2020 presidential election as illegitimate.

The AP sent a survey about drop boxes to the top elections offices in each state in May 2022. Forty-five states responded, reporting no instances of the boxes being connected to voter fraud or stolen ballots, and only a handful of cases in which boxes were damaged. D'Souza responded, "This AP article contends that mail-in drop boxes are fine because: 1. Election officials say so. 2. There have been hardly any cases of dropboxes being vandalized or damaged. Everyone that has seen #2000Mules will recognize how pathetic and silly this is!".

== Accused mule's suit and responses ==
In October 2022, Atlanta citizen Mark Andrews sued Dinesh D'Souza, True the Vote, Gregg Phillips, Catherine Engelbrecht and Salem Media Group for defamation, conspiracy, and intrusion on seclusion. The film accused him of being a "mule" who illegally harvested ballots as part of a fraud ring. Although the film had blurred his face, the film's trailer and promotional stills used his image. A state investigation found that Andrews was legally dropping off ballots for himself, his wife, and their three adult children, who all lived at the same address. The state exonerated Andrews a few days before the movie's premiere. D'Souza settled with Andrews in 2026 immediately before the scheduled trial.

On May 31, 2024, Salem Media Group, which helped produce and distribute the D'Souza film and book, released a public apology to Andrews, saying it had relied on representations from D'Souza and True the Vote. Salem also disavowed the book and the film and withdrew them from distribution. In a lawsuit Salem filed against its insurer for not covering costs related to Andrews's lawsuit, Salem revealed it had settled Andrews's suit for a "significant" amount. The apology and disavowal came as part of the settlement. Andrews dismissed his claims against Salem after the apology but the suit, which names multiple defendants, remained ongoing.

On December 1, 2024, D'Souza posted a statement which included "We recently learned that surveillance videos used in the film may not have actually been correlated with the geolocation data [...] Again, I apologize to Mr. Andrews."

== Cast ==
Not including people only appearing in archive footage.

- Dinesh D'Souza, director, host and narrator
- Debbie D'Souza
- True the Vote: Catherine Engelbrecht, Gregg Phillips
- Salem Radio Network hosts: Dennis Prager, Sebastian Gorka, Larry Elder, Eric Metaxas, Charlie Kirk
- The Heritage Foundation: Hans von Spakovsky
- Capital Research Center: Scott Walter

== Book ==
A book based on the film was set for release in September 2022. It had been promoted by D'Souza as including new evidence supporting the film's claims, including the names of specific nonprofits supposedly involved in the conspiracies. Shortly before the scheduled release, the book's publisher, Regnery Publishing, abruptly recalled physical copies already sent to stores, and delayed the e-book release, citing an unspecified "publishing error". NPR obtained a copy, reporting that it repeated the same false claims as made in the film, and features new allegations, including naming specific nonprofits D'Souza claims were involved. Several of these groups have threatened legal action in response.

The book was released in October 2022, with references to named nonprofits removed. Language regarding some was softened, and sections linking antifa and Black Lives Matter to election fraud were omitted.

== See also ==
- 537 Votes
- Ballot selfie
- Ballot tracking in the United States
- Blue shift (politics)
- Michael Gableman#Investigation into 2020 election results
- Postal voting in the 2020 United States elections
- Presidential Advisory Commission on Election Integrity
- Recount (film)
