= Fettweis =

Fettweis is a surname. Notable people with the surname include:

- Alfred Fettweis (1926–2015), Belgian-born German engineering scientist and communications engineer
- Christopher Fettweis, American political scientist
- Gerhard Fettweis (born 1962), German electrical engineer and university professor
