= True the Vote =

Conservative vote-monitoring organization

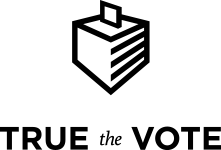
- Formation: November 30, 2009; 16 years ago
- Founder: Catherine Engelbrecht
- Type: 501(c)(3) organization
- Tax ID no.: 27-2860095
- Purpose: Preventing voter fraud
- Headquarters: Houston, Texas, U.S.
- Official language: English
- Key people: Gregg Phillips
- Website: truethevote.org

True the Vote (TTV) is a conservative vote-monitoring organization based in Houston, Texas, whose stated objective is stopping voter fraud. The organization supports voter ID laws and trains volunteers to be election monitors and to spot and bring attention to suspicious voter registrations that its volunteers believe delegitimize voter eligibility. The organization's founder is Catherine Engelbrecht.

Since 2020, True the Vote has become known for its support for the disproven conspiracy theory that Joe Biden's victory in the 2020 United States presidential election was due to fraud. In the aftermath of that election, the group repeatedly claimed that they possessed evidence of widespread voter fraud in the election, and solicited millions of dollars in donations, but never released any evidence. The organization was the primary source for the disproven Dinesh D'Souza film 2000 Mules; in 2024 it acknowledged, to a judge in Georgia, that it had actually had no evidence of voter fraud in the 2020 election.

Americans for Prosperity and other Republican-leaning independent groups have sponsored meetings featuring speakers from the group, including Engelbrecht.

== History ==
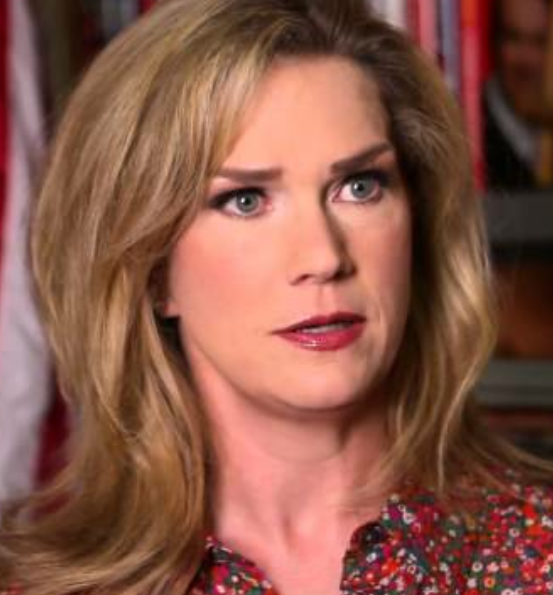
Founder Catherine Engelbrecht in 2012

True the Vote is an offshoot of the King Street Patriots, a nonprofit Tea Party movement organization founded by Engelbrecht and active mostly in Texas. Several members of the King Street Patriots, including Engelbrecht, its president, were dissatisfied with the voting process in Harris County, Texas, during the 2008 election, especially the shortage of poll workers, which they believed "invited fraud and other problems at the polls," and they founded the second group in mid-2009.

== 2010 election cycle ==
In August 2010, Harris County Voter Registrar Leo Vasquez told ABC News, "We have evidence indicating violations of the Texas election code, falsified documents being submitted to this governmental office and possibly violations of federal election laws." His office's investigation found 1,597 instances of multiple applications for the same voter, 1,014 applications for folks already registered to vote, 325 for teenagers who are too young to register and 25 from folks who admitted on the application they are not even US citizens. Vasquez said all the applications were gathered by paid deputies with the group Houston Votes. Of the 25,000 applications the group filed in the months of June, July, and August 2010, only 7,193 were actually for new voters.

True the Vote's activities during the 2010 election cycle were largely confined to Harris County, Texas. True the Vote asserted that it uncovered numerous examples of voter fraud, stating, for example: "Vacant lots had several voters registered on them. An eight-bed halfway house had more than 40 voters registered at its address. During the election, the Texas Democratic Party accused True the Vote of voter intimidation in largely Hispanic and African-American polling areas."

== 2011–12 Wisconsin recall effort ==
In 2012, True the Vote joined several other Tea Party groups in "Verify the Recall", an effort that opposed the attempted recall of Wisconsin governor Scott Walker in the Wisconsin gubernatorial recall election. True the Vote provided software that it had previously applied to check signatures in petitions in Texas. In order to electronically check over 1 million petition signatures, which had previously been posted online by the Wisconsin Government Accountability Board, True the Vote recruited 17,000 volunteers (mostly out of state) to manually enter signatures into True the Vote's electronic database. True the Vote says it recruited over 13,000 volunteers. True the Vote's website has run at least two stories suggesting that fraud is "rampant" in the recall effort, and frame the effort as decidedly political, saying that "we should not believe the claims of union-supporters and anti-Walker operatives who say that they collected more than one million signatures on petitions to recall Governor Scott Walker.".

On February 28, Walker called for the data gathered by the "Verify the Recall" effort to be used as an official challenge of the recall. This information was gathered and compiled entirely by True the Vote. True the Vote's executive summary contended that only 534,865 signatures gathered during the recall effort were valid. Ultimately the Government Accountability Board ruled that about 900,000 signatures were valid. The New York Times and PR Watch reported apparent systematic errors in True the Vote's signature verification methods.

In the days before the June 5, 2012 recall election, True the Vote announced that it would be training volunteers to monitor polling places throughout Wisconsin, both online and at a small number of locations throughout the state True the Vote stated that hundreds of people showed up for training and later monitored the polls in Wisconsin, and that these monitors were necessary because of "discrepancies" in the recall petition process as well as "Wisconsin's long history of election fraud." True the Vote pledged to man every polling place in Wisconsin on the day of the recall election, which drew sharp criticism from the Barret campaign.

Throughout the Wisconsin recall, True the Vote worked in concert with a group of local Tea Party groups including the "Wisconsin Grandsons of Liberty" and "We the People of the Republic", which helped True the Vote launch its recall signature verification efforts.

== Congressional investigation, 2012 ==
In October 2012, Rep. Elijah Cummings, a Maryland Democrat, initiated an investigation into alleged voter suppression by True the Vote. Cummings wrote a letter to Engelbrecht, raising questions about voter challenges in Ohio, North Carolina, Wisconsin and Maryland. He indicated that if the efforts to challenge voter registrations were "intentional, politically motivated and widespread across multiple states, they could amount to a criminal conspiracy to deny legitimate voters their constitutional rights." In February 2014, True the Vote filed complaints against Cummings including charges of ethics violations after Internal Revenue Service (IRS) emails released by the House Oversight Committee showed staff working for Democratic Ranking Member Elijah Cummings communicated with the IRS multiple times between 2012 and 2013 about True the Vote. Prior to this revelation, Cummings had maintained that at no time was he nor his staff in communication with IRS officials regarding True the Vote. Information contained within the emails show that the IRS and Cummings' staff asked for nearly identical information from Engelbrecht about her organization, implying coordination and improper sharing between the two groups of confidential taxpayer information.

== Alleged forgery of signatures in Ohio ==
In 2012, True the Vote applied to the Franklin County Board of Elections (FCBOE) in Ohio to place polling observers in Columbus area districts with large African-American populations. A November 6, 2012, news report in the Cleveland Leader stated that the FCBOE had determined that five of the six signatures on the application were likely forged. Because this type of fraud is a fifth degree felony, the FCBOE declared that an investigation would be conducted after the election.

Engelbrecht responded to the allegations by saying that the signatures on the initial form were genuine, and, following Franklin County instructions, were copied onto subsequent forms. She said that prior to the placement of observers, the candidates rescinded their approval following threats of lawsuits. Engelbrecht said that the allegation of forgery was "blatant slander", and that William Anthony, the director of the FCBOE, was formerly the chairman of the county Democratic Party. She requested that Anthony release the timeline of events surrounding the allegations and clarify whether there was any coordination with the Democratic Party.

== Other activity, 2011–12 ==
On December 13, 2011, it held a rally in Austin, Texas to support a stricter ID law passed earlier that year. The organization held a national summit in Houston largely centered on charges of voter fraud. Speakers included ACORN whistle-blower Anita Moncrief, Hans von Spakovsky of The Heritage Foundation, who insisted that "United States has a long history of voter fraud that has been documented by historians and journalists," and President Jimmy Carter's pollster and Fox News contributor Pat Caddell, who called opposition to voter ID Laws "the demise of our democracy" and "Slow motion suicide."

== 2013 ==
In February 2013, True the Vote filed a federal lawsuit against St. Lucie County elections supervisor Gertrude Walker in Florida, claiming that she had failed to turn over public records related to the US House of Representatives election race between Allen West (R) and Patrick Murphy (D): The latter had won by a margin of 2,429 votes. They stated that withholding the documents violated the 1993 Motor Voter Law, which grants them permission to "publicly inspect and examine all voter registration and election records" in question.

In May 2013, it was revealed that True the Vote was one of the groups allegedly subjected to additional scrutiny by the IRS in applying for tax-exempt status.

According to the National Review, since founding True the Vote, Engelbrecht and her husband say they and their business, Engelbrecht Manufacturing, have also been investigated by the Federal Bureau of Investigation (FBI), the Bureau of Alcohol, Tobacco, Firearms and Explosives (ATF), and the Occupational Safety and Health Administration (OSHA). Engelbrecht has stated that she "absolutely" thinks she was targeted because she "worked against voter fraud."

On May 21, 2013, the organization filed a lawsuit in the District of Columbia against the IRS over claims that the agency delayed the determination process for its application for 501(c)(3) tax-exempt status, publicly claiming, "We've been waiting for three years to receive a decision from the IRS about our tax exempt status. After answering hundreds of questions and producing thousands of documents, we're done waiting. The IRS does not have the power to pocket veto our application. Federal law empowers groups like True the Vote to force a decision in court – which is precisely what we aim to do."

In July 2013, Mother Jones said that the magazine had obtained documents indicating that Engelbrecht was a member of the Groundswell Group, a conservative group of journalists and activists that meet secretly to stay consistent on messaging. The group includes Virginia Thomas, wife of US Supreme Court Justice Clarence Thomas, and John Bolton, former U.S. Ambassador to the United Nations, along with journalists from the National Review, Breitbart News, and the Washington Examiner.

== 2014 ==
On February 6, 2014, Engelbrecht testified before the House Oversight and Government Reform Committee at a hearing about the IRS's targetings. She alleged that ranking member Elijah Cummings had acted to "demonize and intimidate" her organization by sending it letters that duplicated IRS requests and by appearing on cable news to "publicly defame" her and True the Vote. Based on those allegations, Engelbrecht filed a formal ethics complaint against Cummings.

In September 2014, TTV celebrated U.S. Attorney General Eric Holder's intention to resign his position stating, "It is our hope that Mr. Holder's announcement marks an end to the radical, racialist assault on voters' rights across America."

In October 2014, True the Vote's lawsuit against the IRS in response to the IRS targeting scandal was dismissed in the Washington D.C. District Court. The organization announced on December 18 that it had filed a notice of appeal for the United States Court of Appeals for the District of Columbia.

In November 2014, the organization denounced President Barack Obama's executive order for deferred action on deportations, claiming the move would cause an "intentional overwhelm" of state agencies and would potentially compromise voter rolls. True the Vote attacked a presidential nominee for the U.S. Election Assistance Commission in a fundraising letter dated December 19, 2014, labeling Matthew S. Butler a "book burner" for having recently served as the CEO of Media Matters for America.

== 2015 ==
In January 2015, Engelbrecht was called before the United States Senate Committee on the Judiciary during the confirmation hearing for Attorney General Nominee Loretta Lynch, where she questioned whether the proposed change in leadership would affect the larger Justice Department: "Attorney General Eric Holder has created a radical, racialist agency that metes out social justice on an as-needed basis to promote the advancement of a progressive agenda. Will Ms. Lynch follow in his footsteps or, will she turn in a new direction?"

== 2020 ==
On November 25, 2020, less than a month after having provided them with a $2.5 million donation, North Carolina money manager Fred Eshelman sued True the Vote for failing to provide him with information about the progress of their Validate the Vote 2020 initiative and failing to achieve the aims of this initiative. The suit was first filed in federal court, then later withdrawn and re-filed in Texas state court. In April 2021 the suit was dismissed for lack of standing.

Validate the Vote is a True the Vote initiative launched shortly after the 2020 U.S. presidential election and led by Engelbrecht, described in a press release as intended to provide that the 2020 election reflected the principle of "one vote for one voter," and aimed to protect the integrity of the US electoral system and ensure public confidence and acceptance of election outcomes critical to American democracy. Validate the Vote pursued several strategies, among them finding whistleblower witnesses to election wrongdoing, data analysis to find irregularities, and lawsuits to obtain access to voter rolls. After failing to persuade Trump's legal team to join its legal strategy, True the Vote withdrew its lawsuits on November 16. None of its strategies produced evidence of significant problems with the election. Engelbrecht has stated that, as of February 2021, the group's investigations were "ongoing".

== 2021 ==
Ahead of the 2021 U.S. Senate runoff elections in Georgia True the Vote challenged the validity of hundreds of thousands of voter registrations. A Georgia organization Fair Fight sued, alleging that TTV was engaging in voter suppression pursuant to provisions of the Voting Rights Act. The case was resolved in TTV's favor at the beginning of 2024.

In his opinion judge Steve C. Jones wrote that TTV had facilitated "a mass number of seemingly frivolous challenges." He added "TTV's list utterly lacked reliability. Indeed, it verges on recklessness" and "[t]he Court has heard no testimony and seen no evidence of any significant quality control efforts, or any expertise guiding the data process."

Nevertheless, the court ruled narrowly that TTV's actions had not met the conditions for voter suppression set forth in the Voting Rights Act.

== 2022 ==
In May 2022, Dinesh D'Souza released 2000 Mules, a film alleging Democrat-aligned individuals were paid to illegally collect and deposit ballots into drop boxes in Arizona, Georgia, Michigan, Pennsylvania and Wisconsin during the 2020 presidential election. The film was based on research by True the Vote. Former president Donald Trump repeated his false claim of a stolen election when he praised the film as exposing "great election fraud".

Salem Media Group in 2024 halted all distribution of the film and book. It apologized to a Georgia man falsely accused in 2000 Mules, blaming "representations made to us by Dinesh D'Souza and True the Vote".

The Georgia man who had been falsely accused of voting crimes in the movie filed a defamation lawsuit against True the Vote, D'Souza, and Salem Media Group in 2022. The man was shown in video surveillance delivering ballots with the voice-over "What you are seeing is a crime. These are fraudulent votes." The erroneous accusation, with the image of the man and his vehicle license plate sometimes identifiable, also appeared in movie publicity material, promotional appearances, and the accompanying book. In fact the Georgia Bureau of Investigation had investigated and determined it was not illegal activity even before the movie was released.

National Public Radio (NPR) reported: "A conservative 'election integrity' group called True The Vote has made multiple misleading or false claims about its work, NPR has found, including the suggestion that they helped solve the murder of an eight-year-old girl in Atlanta. The claims appear in a new pro-Trump film called '2,000 Mules'..." NPR stated that True the Vote's claim they "solved a murder of a young little girl in Atlanta" was false.

Analysis conducted by the Associated Press (AP) found that the film was "based on faulty assumptions, anonymous accounts and improper analysis of cellphone location data". The AP explained that in various swing counties across the five states, True the Vote used phone pings to cellphone towers to identify individuals who had passed near ballot drop boxes and various unnamed nonprofit organizations multiple times per day, concluding that such people were paid mules for ballot collection and deposits. Experts said such mobile phone tracking was not accurate enough to distinguish alleged mules from many other people who might walk or drive by a ballot box or nonprofit during the course of a day, such as delivery drivers, postal workers and cab drivers. True the Vote asserted it had conducted "pattern of life" filtering of such people prior to the election season, though the AP noted limitations of that approach.

The film also asserted that some of the geolocated alleged mules were also present at what it called "antifa riots" in Atlanta during the George Floyd protests in summer 2020, though AP explained that the geolocation data also could not reliably determine why people were present at that event; they could have been peaceful protesters, police or firefighters responding to the protests, or business owners in the area. D'Souza and Gregg Phillips, a True the Vote board member, asserted they had matched their geolocation data with data from the Armed Conflict Location and Event Data Project (ACLED). In the film, Phillips claimed "dozens and dozens and dozens of our mules show up on the ACLED databases" as what were characterized as "antifa rioters". ACLED said the claims were categorically false, noting it does not track cellphone data. Engelbrecht asserted Phillips was actually referring to a different organization, then he mentioned ACLED, but she declined to name the different organization, saying Phillips relied on "multiple databases".

2000 Mules does not inform viewers that, even if the events it depicts occurred, every absentee ballot deposited in a drop box must be inside an envelope sent to each registered voter that includes the voter's registration information, signature, and a barcode for verification. Ballots lacking the envelope are rejected. True the Vote did not assert any of the ballots involved in the alleged mule scheme were illegal.

The AP reported that the film's assertion that True the Vote identified 1,155 paid mules in Philadelphia alone was false. The film presented a single anonymous witness who said she saw people picking up what she "assumed" to be payments for ballot collection in Arizona; no evidence of payments was presented in any of the other four states. The film presents no evidence that ballots were collected from a nonprofit to be deposited in drop boxes. None of the surveillance videos in the film show any individual dropping off ballots more than once. True the Vote claims about video of multiple drops by an individual, "Some of that footage was shown in the first trailer. It was taken out because the video is extremely poor quality."

True the Vote did not cooperate with investigations by Georgia election officials, refusing to disclose the names of people who allegedly collected ballots. The State Election Board issued subpoenas to the organization in April 2022, seeking documents, recordings and names of individuals involved; the Board sued the organization in July 2023 for failure to comply with the subpoenas. The GBI examined the True the Vote allegations in fall 2021 but did not find sufficient evidence to open an investigation.

In October 2022, the office of Republican Arizona attorney general Mark Brnovich referred True the Vote to the FBI and IRS for possible investigation, finding that Engelbrecht and Phillips had falsely told the office they had given their data to the Phoenix FBI office and were working as informants there, while telling the FBI office, the Arizona Senate and the public they had given their data to the attorney general's office, though they had not. Brnovich's office said True the Vote claimed to have evidence of 243 mules in Arizona, but presented no proof. The attorney general's office also suggested True the Vote's tax exempt nonprofit status should be examined.

In late 2022, Phillips alleged in a social media and podcast campaign that his associates had discovered evidence that Konnech, a poll worker management software company, had stored data on a Chinese server and allowed the Chinese government to access it. Phillips said the discovery had been made by two associates who hacked Konnech's servers. Konnech filed a federal defamation suit against True the Vote in September, also alleging True the Vote acquired information on millions of poll workers from the alleged hack. During an October court hearing, the involvement of a third Phillips associate was disclosed, but Engelbrecht and Phillips declined federal judge Kenneth Hoyt's demand to identify the man, asserting he was an FBI informant and in danger from drug cartels. Hoyt told them if they didn't identify the man within two days, and present the poll worker data they allegedly obtained, they would be held in contempt of court and jailed; they were jailed for contempt on October 31, 2022. Engelbrecht and Phillips appealed their incarceration to the Fifth Circuit Court of Appeals, a three-judge panel of which ordered them released on November 8.

ProPublica and The Dallas Morning News jointly reported in January 2023 that in 2022 Phillips and Engelbrecht formed an organization to provide a mobile hospital in Ukraine during its war with Russia. Dubbed "The Freedom Hospital," the couple sought to solicit $25 million in donations on conservative media platforms. The project did not materialize, though Phillips spoke of it on Truth Social as though it was in operation. Through their lawyers, Phillips and Engelbrecht said they never raised significant funds, though Phillips had said about half of the $25 million goal had been raised. Their attorneys later said this was an in-kind donation from the mobile hospital manufacturer, rather than cash, though that company's CEO denied such a donation was made. The couple's attorneys said the project was a good faith effort that was unsuccessful.

The Atlanta Journal-Constitution reported in February 2024 that True the Vote said in a filing with the Fulton County Superior Court in response to the Election Board lawsuit that "it doesn't have documents about illegal ballot collection, the name of its purported informant or confidentiality agreements it previously said existed."

== 2024 ==
For the 2024 election, they introduced IV3, a software program which they claim compares U.S. Postal Service information to voter rolls so that anyone can challenge registrations. A Wired examination found the system unreliable, although Phillips said an updated version was rolling out that has close to "100 billion data elements about every single voter in the United States". According to Engelbrecht, as of July 2024, IV3 has logged more than 700,000 challenges of voter registrations. As of April 2024, Phillips was also developing Ground Fusion, software "aimed at organizations and PACs looking to identify voting irregularities across larger geographic regions." In 2024, True the Vote launched VoteAlert, a social media application that allows users to report examples of what they perceive to be voter fraud. Wired had criticized a test version of the app for promoting unfounded conspiracy theories about the election.

== Criticism ==
In October 2010, Ryan J. Reilly, writing for the political news and opinion website Talking Points Memo, criticized True the Vote for engaging in what Reilly said was voter suppression "caging", voter intimidation, and advancing statements about the pervasiveness of voter fraud that he said were unfounded.

In 2012, Democratic Congressman Elijah Cummings opened an investigation into the organization amid its efforts to remove hundreds of students and other voters from registration rolls across the United States in advance of that year's presidential election. Cummings stated, "At some point, an effort to challenge voter registrations by the thousands without any legitimate basis may be evidence of illegal voter suppression. If these efforts are intentional, politically motivated and widespread across multiple states, they could amount to a criminal conspiracy to deny legitimate voters their constitutional rights."

In May 2013, following the IRS targeting controversy, Engelbrecht stated True the Vote was subject to additional scrutiny in applying for tax-exempt status. Engelbrecht said the IRS requested additional information from True the Vote five times, which required thousands of pages of documentation. She said that she spent more than $100,000 in attorney and accountant fees to process the IRS requests. Because of the delay in obtaining tax-exempt status, which lasted for three years, she said True the Vote had to return a $35,000 grant and could not effectively fundraise. In addition to scrutiny by the IRS, the organization was subject to inquiries from the FBI, ATF, and OSHA. "I just kept thinking this can't be happening." Engelbrecht said, "it never ends."

In June 2022, Mother Jones published findings from an analysis of True the Vote's financial documents conducted by The Center for Investigative Reporting. The analysis suggested possible self-dealing with donated funds between Engelbrecht, Gregg Phillips and the organization's attorney, James Bopp.

In July 2023, the Georgia State Election Board filed a lawsuit against True the Vote to compel it to provide information about its claims of payments to individuals to place ballots in dropboxes in Atlanta during the 2020 election.
