= Cathy Cleaver Ruse =

American lawyer and conservative advocate

Cathy Cleaver Ruse is an American lawyer and conservative advocate known for her work in public policy and legal issues related to family, marriage, and life. She has served in various roles, including as a senior fellow for legal studies at the Family Research Council, a conservative Christian public policy organization. Ruse has also been a spokesperson and legal counsel for several other pro-life and pro-family organizations, where she has been instrumental in shaping their legal strategies and advocating for their causes.

In January 2001 she replaced Helen Alvaré as Director of Planning and Information for the U.S. bishops’ Secretariat for Pro-Life Activities.

Throughout her career, she has focused on issues such as abortion, religious liberty, and parental rights, frequently writing and speaking on these topics. Ruse, a devout Catholic, has been involved in legislative advocacy, providing testimony before Congress, and participating in public debates to promote conservative positions on family and life issues. Her work often intersects with her strong religious beliefs, which she sees as the foundation of traditional family values, and is known for defending these values in her advocacy.

In 2007, Ruse, amongst others, was invited by the Pew Research Center to join a panel of distinguished experts to discuss the supreme court case Gonzales v Carhart.

== Personal life ==
Ruse grew up in Saint Petersburg, Florida. She is married to Austin Ruse of the Catholic Family and Human Rights Institute.

== See also ==
- Family Research Council
