= Gregg Phillips =

American government official and conspiracy theorist

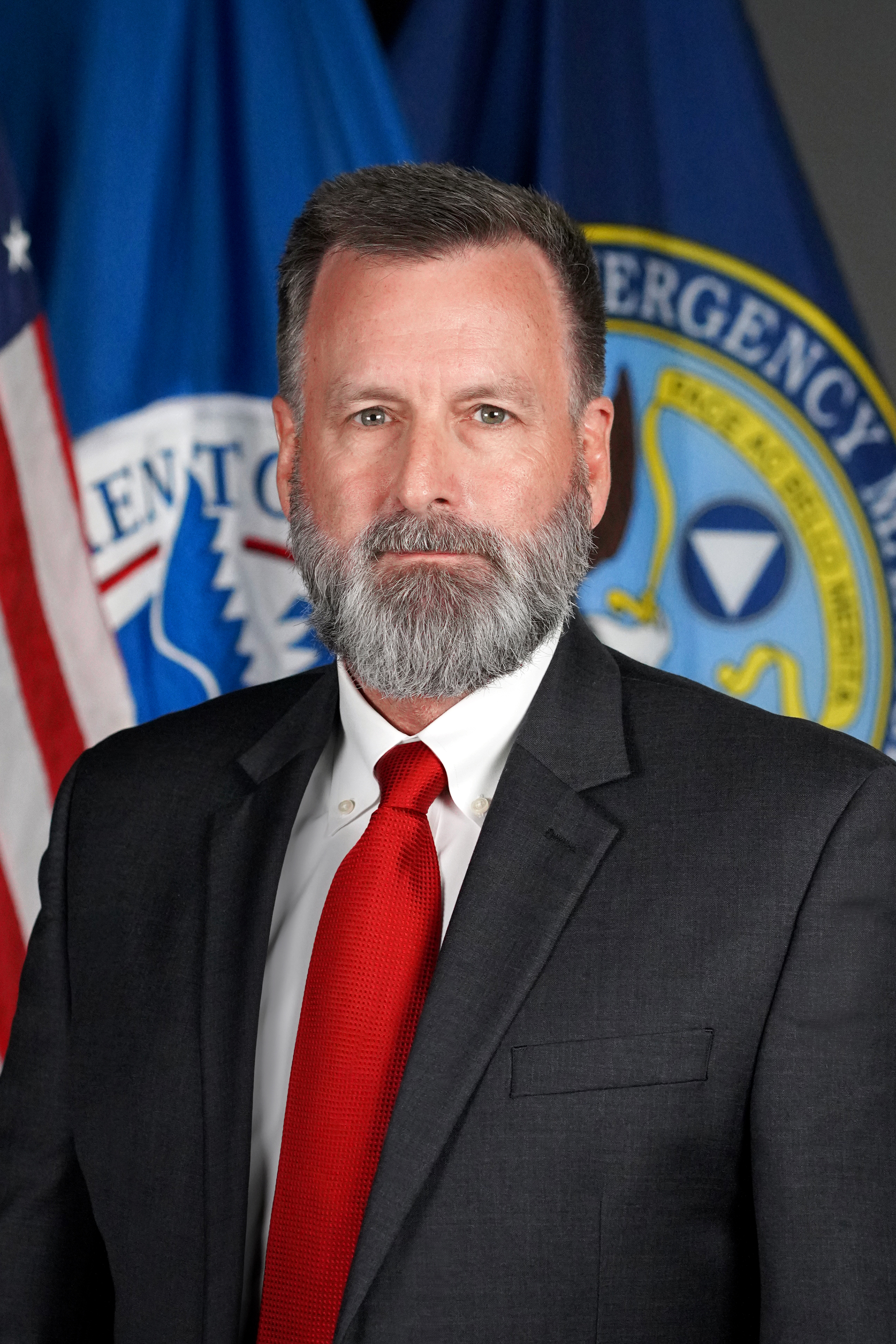
- Official portrait, 2026

Associate Administrator of the Office of Response and Recovery
- In office December 15, 2025 – June 25, 2026
- President: Donald Trump

Head of the Mississippi Department of Human Services
- In office 1993–1995
- Governor: Kirk Fordice

Personal details
- Born: Gregg Allen Phillips; October 13, 1960 (age 66)
- Citizenship: American
- Party: Republican
- Spouse: Helen Phillips
- Education: University of Alabama (BS)
- Occupation: Government official, businessman
- Known for: Promoting election fraud conspiracy theories

Gregg Allen Phillips (born October 13, 1960) is an American conspiracy theorist and former head of the Office of Response and Recovery in the Federal Emergency Management Agency (FEMA). He was formerly head of the Mississippi Department of Human Services, deputy commissioner of the Texas Health and Human Services Commission, and the author of a tweet cited by U.S. President Donald Trump that falsely alleges, without evidence, that between three and five million non-citizens voted in the 2016 elections. Phillips was the executive producer and appears in Dinesh D'Souza's broadly discredited political film 2000 Mules, which promoted a false conspiracy theory about election fraud. Phillips was a partner in the project with the Texas-based conservative organization True the Vote, which alleged widespread voter fraud in the 2020 election while "no evidence or proof provided that there was any sort of fraud".

== Career ==
In the 1990s, Phillips campaigned for Republican gubernatorial nominee Kirk Fordice. A year after his election, Governor Fordice in 1993 nominated Phillips to head the Mississippi Department of Human Services. The Mississippi State Senate approved his nomination despite a discrepancy in Phillips's resume uncovered by the Mississippi Joint Committee on Performance Evaluation and Expenditure Review.

=== Mismanagement accusations ===
In 1994, he privatized the collection of child support in two Mississippi counties by signing a contract with a private company based in Virginia. Phillips left the Department of Human Services in 1995, "under fire from the Legislature for his management of the state welfare programs." A week after leaving Department of Human Services, Phillips was hired by Synesis Corporation, a division of Centec Learning, which had an $878,000 contract to lease mobile learning labs to the University of Mississippi at Oxford as part of LEAP. While overseeing the Department of Human Services, Phillips spearheaded LEAP. The Mississippi Legislature determined that Phillips' actions constituted the "appearance of impropriety" and that Phillips mismanaged his department, finding that Phillips caused the Mississippi Department of Human Services' "failure to comply with federal regulations."

=== Texas ===
Phillips was deputy commissioner for the Texas Health and Human Services Commission from March 2003 to September 3, 2004.

Phillips then ran the health care analytics firm AutoGov. He was described as a "vocal conservative who founded a health-care-data company."

=== Federal service ===
Phillips was appointed to run the Office of Response and Recovery in the Federal Emergency Management Agency (FEMA) starting December 15, 2025. He is the second-highest officer in the agency. His appointment came at a time when the second Donald Trump administration was reorganizing the agency and its mission. Phillips had no documented professional history of working in disaster relief, but he had been recently touting his personal experience on social media.

Phillips has been employed by both the Alabama and Mississippi Republican parties. He is listed as a resident of the capital city of Austin, Texas. An investigation by the Associated Press showed that Phillips was registered to vote in three states: Alabama, Mississippi, and Texas. Phillips responded, "Doesn't that just demonstrate how broken the system is? That is not fraud – that is a broken system. We need a national ID that travels with people."

== Controversies ==
=== Government roles ===
Phillips has faced allegations of ethical misconduct and cronyism, including abusing his previous positions in government in both Mississippi and Texas for personal financial gain. Phillips was found to "award millions in government contracts" to his own personal businesses or associates involved, and then were "quietly shuttered years later". In a follow-up 1995 report by the Mississippi legislature, they concluded that "Mr. Phillips's actions create the appearance of impropriety, facilitating an erosion of the public trust... [that] could constitute a violation of state ethics laws."

In 2003, Texas House of Representatives Arlene Wohlgemuth championed the reorganization of the state's 12 health and human services agencies into five with the passage of House Bill 2292. She recommended that Phillips spearhead the reorganization of the Health and Human Services Commission. She would later push to rush the process, wanting it before September 2004, which drew suspicion and questions as to the urgency.

Unbeknownst to the public, Wohlgemuth legislative director Erica Phillips began dating fellow Republican Texas House Representative Jack Stick. "I think her boss pretty much told her go out with me," Stick would tell the Austin American-Statesman. "In fact, I think she had to tell Erica a few times because it sure took a while." Jack Stick later married Erica Phillips, who changed her name to Erica Stick, on October 16, 2004.

Stick served in the state House between 2003 and 2005, was a municipal judge and later worked as legal counsel from March 2006 to December 2007 for AutoGov, one of Phillips's companies that obtained contracts for government healthcare work, subcontracting under another one of his companies named GHT Development. In March 2007, Stick's matchmaker and the former Representative Arlene Wohlgemuth became a lobbyist, at which point she brought the House Appropriations Committee a proposal that she acknowledged would probably steer a technology contract to GHT Development, which Gregg Phillips owned.

Erica Phillips entered the Texas Health and Human Services Commission in 2005 and was promoted to chief of staff in 2012 with an annual salary of $160,000. She ultimately had to resign from her role under then executive commissioner Kyle Janek on February 15, 2015, amidst criminal investigations and scandals related to her husband Jack Stick steering a no-bid $110 million state contract to a local company in which he had significant conflicts of financial interest as a legislator.

According to Kevin Lyons, spokesperson for the Texas comptroller, Phillips was unable to do business in the state of Texas. "He's one of our revolving door kind of hustlers," said Andrew Wheat, the research director of Texans for Public Justice.

Phillips and his wife Helen owed the U.S. government more than $100,961 in unpaid taxes according to a lien filed by the IRS in Manatee County, Florida, as of 2014. Phillips responded to The Guardian via text: "I am in a disagreement with the IRS over income taxes. The amount owed is less than $50,000."

==== Enterject, Inc. ====
Under Phillips, Larry Temple became the deputy director of the Mississippi Department of Human Services. Phillips later founded Enterject, Inc. in 2000 in Atlanta, Georgia. Enterject used the internet to track tax credits for employers and offer web-based welfare-to-work training, government contract-procurement lobbying, tax-credit tracking and Internet-based job training for health and child care workers. It even provided an automated tax credit hotline. Temple became the welfare reform director for the Texas Workforce Commission in 1997 and agency executive director in September 2003.

In 2004, the Houston Chronicle "reported allegations that Temple steered a $670,270 state contract to a company founded by a friend, Gregg Phillips, the No. 2 official at the Texas Health and Human Services Commission." Temple hired Phillips's sister in law Mary Katherine "Kaki" Roesch Leyens for a $55,000-a-year job in the Texas Workforce Commission after she divorced Vicksburg, Mississippi Mayor Laurence Leyens. Ann Fuelberg, who was a subcontractor on a Texas Workforce Commission project overseen by Enterject, would quit Enterject when she was named executive director of the Employees Retirement System of Texas.

Phillips earned $180,000 annually as the CEO of Enterject, Inc. Phillips claimed that he severed all ties when he was at the Texas Health and Human Services Commission, having turned it over to the Operations Officer Paige Harkins, herself the daughter of real estate developer Gary Harkins, a friend of Temple and whom Temple called an old "family friend". The Houston Chronicle found this to be false based on phone records and documents, as he was forming contracts for Enterject, Inc. while Health and Human Services Commission receiving $167 million in contracts. Though Temple denied that he or his son worked for Enterject, the company won two contracts from the Texas Workforce Commission: $2.7 million in job-training grants and a $670,000 contract managing immigrants' labor certifications.

When the conflict of interest was uncovered by The Houston Chronicle, Phillips claimed that he had no plans to return to Enterject, and that he had cut all ties. However, the Georgia Secretary of State's Office listed Phillips's wife, Helen, as the company's chief financial officer. Phillips claimed that his wife was just a part-time bookkeeper for the company. Additionally, GHT Development Inc. owned the internet registration for Enterject, Inc. which itself was owned by Phillips and for which he was its CEO.

==== GHT Development, Inc. ====
GHT was an umbrella corporation, which oversaw another one of Gregg's Austin based companies AutoGov, which was "a predictive data analytics company focused on health care." AutoGov was paid more than $400,000 over the course of two years through GHT for work with the Texas Youth Commission by 2007.

In March 2007, former Representative Arlene Wohlgemuth turned lobbyist, brought the House Appropriations Committee a proposal, which she acknowledged that the amendment's wording would probably steer a technology contract to GHT Development.

==== AutoGov Inc. ====
Jack Stick, former Chief Counsel for Texas Health and Human Services Commission, was general counsel from 2006 to 2007 with AutoGov. By 2009, AutoGov was doing work for the Health and Human Services Commission, but as a subcontractor hired by Maximus, Inc. Albert Hawkins, the former Commissioner of the Texas Health and Human Services Commission, approved the subcontract shortly before leaving office. The Texas Health and Human Services Commission hired AutoGov without soliciting bids from other companies, and Phillips headed AutoGov Inc. in 2010 purportedly to help Texas' food stamp program eliminate errors in the applicant screening process. AutoGov was paid $297,000 by Maximus until the contract was terminated in July 2010. The company had made $600,000 for various work with state agencies. The commission paid AutoGov more than $100,000 following an October 2010 settlement signed by then-Executive Commissioner Thomas Suehs.

==== CoverMe Services Inc. ====
In 2018, Phillips renamed AutoGov, Inc. to CoverMe Services Inc. with himself as CEO and Catherine Engelbrecht as CFO. CoverMe claimed that "in the span of a five-minute interview, hospitals can provide patients with real-time eligibility and enrollment support, creating better outcomes for both the patient and provider." It made $1.7 million charging services to University of Mississippi Medical Center for work through 2023

=== True the Vote ===
An investigation by The Center for Investigative Reporting found that Phillips and the Texas-based nonprofit organization True the Vote engaged in questionable transactions that involving more than $1 million sent to its founders, and a longtime romantic affair between the founder Catherine Engelbrecht and Phillips.

On August 17, 2012, True the Vote sent $5,000 to the Republican State Leadership Committee, which is illegal because a registered 501(c)(3) nonprofit may not contribute to any political party or candidates.

In 2014, True the Vote paid $25,000 to American Solutions for Winning the Future for a "donor list rental". Phillips was the director of American Solutions for Winning the Future.

In 2015, True the Vote gave $30,000 to a company called Define Idea Inc. for "IT support services". Phillips was also a director of Define Idea Inc.

True the Vote gave a retainer of half a million dollars to James Bopp's law firm to lead the prosecution of cases related to 2020 election fraud claims, however, Bopp only filed four of seven lawsuits committed to Fred Eshelman in exchange for his $2.5 million donation. Then, less than a week after filing, they voluntarily dismissed the suits claiming that they were saving the client money; Bopp kept the money and True the Vote kept the remaining $2 million.

Of the $2 million left over from Eshelman's donation, $750,000 went to OPSEC Group LLC, a new company created by Phillips and based out of Alabama, purportedly to do voter analysis. The contract with OPSEC did not appear to be disclosed in the 2020 tax return True The Vote provided to Reveal. Specifically, on November 9, 2020, OPSEC Group submitted a bill for $350,000 to True the Vote for "Validate the Vote", and again billed another $700,000 on December 7 for a project called Eyes on Georgia, according to court records.

=== "The Freedom Hospital" in Ukraine ===
On June 5, 2022, Gregg Phillips had announced on Truth Social that he had begun a nonprofit under the name "The Freedom Project" and began soliciting donations to raise $25 million for a mobile hospital in Ukraine in response to the Russo-Ukrainian War. He claimed to have already raised half the amount needed due to an in-kind donation from manufacturer MED-1 Partners, but MED-1's CEO Tim Masud denied making a pledge or offer of any such donation. Additionally, "The Freedom Hospital" posted a video on its YouTube account with a caption saying that its team was reporting from Ukraine. The Freedom Hospital had no role in producing the video, and Christopher Loverro, a Los Angeles-based actor and veteran, who made the video in front of a recently bombed Ukrainian preschool, said he never had any connection to The Freedom Hospital and had not given anyone permission to use his work. Loverro said he reported the video to YouTube and commented on the post, warning: "This is a scam. Do not donate to this organization." The hospitals in Ukraine never materialized, and Phillips abandoned the project earlier in April 2022, months before making the fundraising posts on TruthSocial, according to his attorney. True the Vote was listed as the fiscal sponsor on the website, which has since been deleted.

=== Claims of teleportation ===
On a January 2025 podcast appearance, Phillips claimed that he had been teleported [sic] against his will on multiple occasions. These purported incidents include being teleported 40 miles to a ditch near a church, along with the car he was driving, and 50 miles to a Waffle House in Rome, Georgia. A New York Times reporter was unable to locate any employees of the 3 Waffle House restaurants in town who recalled seeing Gregg Phillips or recalled any teleportation. Phillips has doubled down on the claim, citing Biblical miracles, despite the skepticism and scrutiny.

When asked by CNN, President Trump reacted with confusion, asking "What does teleport mean?" and "Was he kidding?", Trump also described Phillips’ teleportation claims as “strange” and said he would look into them. The White House later urged DHS to either remove Phillips or keep him out of the public eye. Sources say Phillips has since been sidelined from FEMA operations and told to stop posting about teleportation on Truth Social.

== Unsubstantiated and false voter fraud claims ==
In 2013, Phillips's firm partnered with the partisan-conservative, Texas-based organization True the Vote to, according to Phillips, update and analyze voter registration data in the U.S. to supposedly identify indicators of each person voting such as: citizenship or non-citizenship, identity, and felony status. He has falsely asserted that his organization has evidence that between three and five million votes were illegal in the 2016 presidential election. Phillips made his voter fraud claims before voter history data was available in most jurisdictions.

Later the group changed its stance and blamed a lack of funding as the cause when Catherine Engelbrecht stated in a video message "As it stands, we do not have the funding to do what we want to do. We've gathered 2016 voter rolls, we've gathered information from thousands of [ Freedom of Information Act requests], but we're limited by the lack of resources [...] Next steps up are for us to sort of pull back on the national audit, and focus on targeted investigations." In March 2017, Phillips told The Texas Tribune the final results were still forthcoming but the audit was no longer going to happen. He also claimed that the 2020 election was rigged to steal the election from Trump, but has not provided any such evidence other than fabricated evidence in the form of Russian maps manipulated to look like American maps tracking non-existing vote mules.

=== 2000 Mules (2022) ===
In May 2022, Dinesh D'Souza released 2000 Mules, a debunked political film which falsely alleged that Democrat-aligned individuals were paid to illegally collect and deposit ballots into drop boxes in Arizona, Georgia, Michigan, Pennsylvania and Wisconsin during the 2020 presidential election, based on unsubstantiated allegations by True the Vote involving cellphone data.

Philip Bump of The Washington Post wrote about the faulty "reliability of [Phillip's] analysis of data collected from cellphones", saying "there's good reason to think that Phillips's analyses don't include precise measurements of proximity to ballot drop boxes".

According to Houston Public Media and NPR, Phillips made a "false claim" that alleged research helped "solved a murder of a young little girl in Atlanta", with True The Vote acknowledging it had reached out to law enforcement "more than two months later", and had "played no role in those arrests or indictments".

Republican Georgia Secretary of State Brad Raffensperger examined one instance of voter fraud falsely alleged by Phillips, whereby a man delivered multiple ballots to a dropbox. Raffensperger stated that his office found no wrongdoing: "We investigated, and the five ballots that he turned in were all for himself and his family members."

Eight Arizona Republican officials held a meeting with about 200 others to hear a presentation from Phillips weeks after the release of 2000 Mules. Phillips characterized the press as "journalistic terrorists" for demonstrating the film's lack of proof. Asked if he had turned over evidence to law enforcement, Phillips said he had given data to the Arizona attorney general's office and the FBI a year earlier, though the offices said they never received it.

Jennifer Wright, chief attorney at Arizona Attorney General Mark Brnovich's election integrity unit, worked for Gregg Phillips at True the Vote before going to work for Brnovich. Phillips alleged his group investigated the ballot harvesting in San Luis, Arizona, resulting in the arrest of former school board member and former San Luis Mayor Guillermina Fuentes. Records show the investigation was done in August 2020 and the indictment occurred in December 2020. Phillips also claimed that these two indicted suspects pled guilty after having watched the film 2000 Mules. Alma Juarez pled guilty on January 18, 2022 and Guillermina Fuentes pled guilty on April 11, 2022, whereas the film had a wide release on May 25, and limited screenings May 2 and 4, 2022, making this impossible.

=== Konnech, Inc. (2022) ===
In late 2022, Phillips falsely alleged in a social media and podcast campaign that his associates had discovered evidence that Konnech, a poll worker management software company, had stored data on a Chinese computer server and allowed the Chinese government to access it. Phillips said the discovery had been made by two associates who hacked Konnech's servers. Konnech filed a federal defamation suit against True the Vote in September, also alleging True the Vote acquired information on millions of poll workers from the alleged hack.

During an October court hearing, the involvement of a third Phillips associate was disclosed, but Catherine Engelbrecht and Phillips declined federal judge Kenneth Hoyt's demand to identify the man, asserting he was an FBI informant and in danger from drug cartels. Phillips and Engelbrecht also testified to being confidential informants for the FBI while under oath. Hoyt told them if they didn't identify the man within two days, and present the poll worker data they allegedly obtained, they would be held in contempt of court and jailed; they were jailed for contempt on October 31, 2022. Engelbrecht and Phillips appealed their incarceration to the Fifth Circuit Court of Appeals, a three-judge panel of which ordered them released on November 8.

Phillips made a complaint about Konnech's data handling to the Los Angeles County District Attorney's office, which then used his information to begin a prosecution of Konnech's CEO in October 2022. All charges were dropped by the DA a few weeks later, citing that the evidence presented had been potentially biased. Konnech's CEO sued the county, and settled for a $5 million settlement.
