= FEMA Office of Response and Recovery =

Division of FEMA

The Federal Emergency Management Agency Office of Response and Recovery is the agency's largest division, responsible for coordinating federal disaster operations.

Within the office are the

- Logistics Management Directorate, which oversees eight regional distribution centers
- Recovery Directorate
- Response Directorate
- Field Operations Directorate

== History ==
In 1993, Administrator James Lee Witt reorganized FEMA with three functional directorates — the Mitigation Directorate, the Preparedness, Training and Exercises Directorate, and the Response and Recovery Directorate.

The Office of Response and Recovery was formed on October 1, 2009, under Administrator Craig Fugate, in the wake of the Post-Katrina Emergency Management Reform Act of 2006 (Public Law 109-295), which consolidated the Department of Homeland Security Preparedness Directorate under FEMA. The office combined the Response, Recovery, Federal Coordinating Officer Program, and Logistics Management Directorates, and established a new Planning Division.

== Associate Administrators ==
name	start	end
Gregg Phillips	December 2025	
(acting) Keith Turi	May 2024	December 2025
Anne Bink	29 November 2021	15 May 2024
(acting) David Bibo	2020	2021
Jeffrey Byard	4 September 2017	1 February 2020
(acting) Corey Gruber	2017	2017
Elizabeth A. Zimmerman	2014	2017
Joseph Nimmich	2013	2014
William "Bill" L. Carwile III	2009	January 2013
