= The Field of Fight =

2016 book by Michael T. Flynn and Michael Ledeen

The Field of Fight: How We Can Win the Global War Against Radical Islam and its Allies
- Authors: Michael T. Flynn, Michael Ledeen
- Language: English
- Subject: Counter-terrorism, national security
- Publisher: St. Martin's Press
- Publication date: July 1, 2016
- Publication place: United States
- Media type: Print (hardcover)
- Pages: 208
- ISBN: 978-1-2501-0622-3

The Field of Fight: How We Can Win the Global War Against Radical Islam and its Allies is a book on United States national security strategy coauthored by Michael T. Flynn and Michael Ledeen. Published by Macmillan's imprint St. Martin's Press in 2016, it argues that the United States is engaged in a religious world war against what the authors call "Radical Islam"—defined as a violent "tribal cult" emanating from a "failed civilization"—but has so far been hampered in its response by political correctness. The authors claim that the United States and its allies face "an international alliance of evil countries and movements that is working to destroy us" and advocate a combination of increased military action and ideological warfare in response. They identify a range of enemies of which Iran is the foremost, and advocate a strategy of regime change aimed at overthrowing the Iranian government as a key step towards defeating "Radical Islam".

The book briefly entered the US bestseller chart but received a mixed critical response. Its assertions and proposed solutions were strongly criticized by reviewers on both sides of the political divide, though some conservative reviewers praised the book's qualities.

== Background and sales ==
Michael T. Flynn, in whose voice the book is written, is a retired lieutenant general of the United States Army. After having previously been involved in counter-terrorist operations at the Joint Special Operations Command, he became head of the Defense Intelligence Agency in 2012 but was removed from his position in 2014, ending a thirty-year military career. He subsequently became a strident critic of the Barack Obama administration and a key adviser to Republican presidential candidate Donald Trump. Following the 2016 United States presidential election, he was named National Security Advisor by the victorious Trump.

His co-author Michael Ledeen is a neoconservative historian who is the "Freedom Scholar" at the Foundation for Defense of Democracies. He is well known in security circles as a long-standing opponent of Iran, advocating regime change there and previously supporting the 2003 Iraq War.

The Field of Fight emerged from an op-ed that Flynn co-wrote with Republican presidential candidate Carly Fiorina. St Martin's Press announced in December 2015 that it would be publishing the book the following July. In a press release, Flynn said: "I am writing this book for two reasons: first, to show that the war is being waged against us by enemies this administration has forbidden us to describe: radical Islamists. Second, to lay out a winning strategy that is not passively relying on technology and drone attacks to do the job. We could lose this war; in fact, right now we are losing. The Field of Fight will give my view on how to win."

After its publication on July 1, 2016, The Field of Fight briefly entered the Publishers Weekly bestseller list for the week ending July 17. It reached #9 in the chart but fell out of the top 10 the following week.

== Synopsis ==
=== Current situation ===
After a short autobiographical account of Flynn's career, The Field of Fight paints a gloomy picture of the current state of the struggle against terrorism. Flynn says that he is "totally convinced that without a proper sense of urgency, we will be eventually defeated, dominated, and very likely destroyed". As a result, the United States is in danger of being "ruled by men who eagerly drink the blood of their dying enemies". He warns that "radical Islamists" are intent on "creating an Islamic state right here at home" in the United States by imposing Sharia law, forcing Americans to "live the way the unfortunate residents of the 'caliphate' or the oppressed citizens of the Islamic Republic of Iran live today, in a totalitarian state under the dictates of the most rigid version of Sharia."

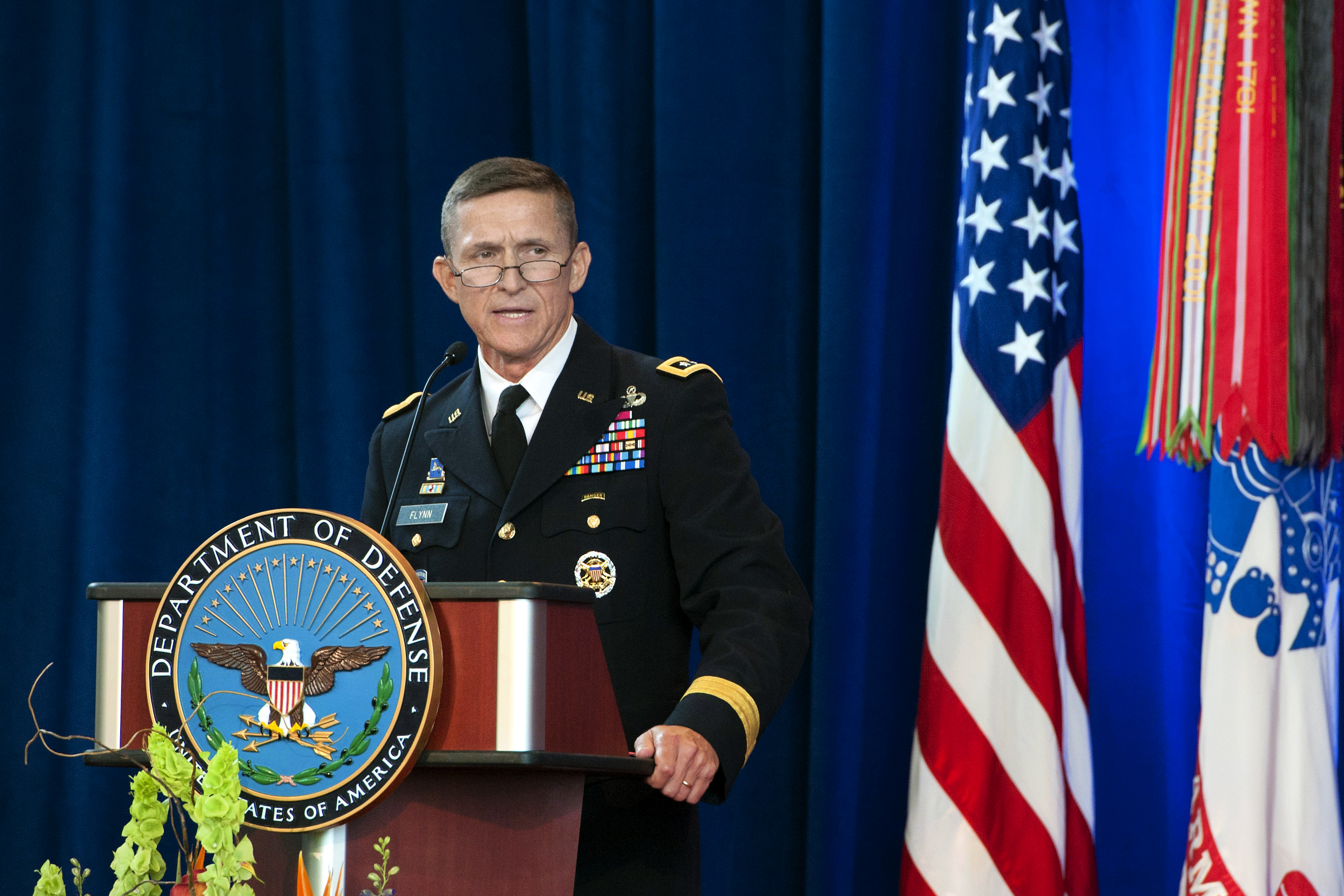
The Field of Fight opens with an autobiographical account of Flynn, one of its co-authors.

The book argues that the US government is hampered by a lack of intelligence-gathering against its enemies and pays insufficient attention to their ideological motivations. Flynn asserts that the US faces "a working coalition that extends from North Korea and China to Russia, Iran, Syria, Cuba, Bolivia, Venezuela, and Nicaragua. We are under attack, not only from nation-states directly, but also from al Qaeda, Hezbollah, ISIS, and countless other terrorist groups." He describes this as "an alliance between radical Islamists and regimes in Havana, Pyongyang, Moscow and Beijing. Both believe that history, and/or Allah, blesses their efforts, and so both want to ensure that this glorious story is carefully told." Flynn argues that this alliance is based on a shared hatred for the United States and "a contempt for democracy and an agreement—by all the members of the enemy alliance — that dictatorship is a superior way to run a country, an empire, or a caliphate". He acknowledges that the idea of an alliance between communist China, North Korea and ISIS/al Qaeda may seem strange, but does not go into detail other than asserting that it exists.

Flynn identifies Iran as the "linchpin" of the alliance. He asserts that events such as the 1979 seizure of the Grand Mosque in Mecca by Sunni extremists and the 1998 United States embassy bombings in Africa—also carried out by Sunni extremists, in this case Al-Qaeda—were actually instigated by Shia Iran. Iran's on-and-off support for al Qaeda is cited as evidence of an alliance between the two; Flynn asserts that for political reasons, the Barack Obama administration has refused to release evidence of this link from Osama bin Laden's captured documents.

Flynn calls for the United States to "remov[e] the sickening chokehold of tyranny, dictatorships, and Radical Islamist regimes", which he says has seriously endangered the United States in recent decades. However, he makes a distinction between friendly and unfriendly dictatorships, categorised by their opposition to "Radical Islam". Thus, dictators such as Egypt's president Abdel Fattah el-Sisi, the former Tunisian president Zine Ben Ali and even Saddam Hussein should have been supported by the US government for their value in fighting "Radical Islam". Working towards democracy in Middle East in the short to medium term is deemed unrealistic, and Flynn advises instead that the focus should be on restoring "order" to the region. Russia would also be an "ideal partner for fighting Radical Islam" if it shared the same worldview on the issue. However, Flynn is critical of Russia's approach, writing that "it behooves us to remember that the Russians haven't been very effective at fighting jihadis on their own territory, and are in cahoots with the Iranians" and acknowledges that Vladimir Putin would probably not welcome cooperation with the US.

Past US government policy towards Iran is strongly criticized by Flynn, who argues that American administrations have consistently failed to oppose the regime effectively. He writes that "no American president" has called for regime change or supported Iranian dissidents and condemns the administrations of Jimmy Carter and Barack Obama for, respectively, failing to support the last Shah of Iran and negotiating a nuclear deal with Iran. Describing the 2003 Iraq War as "a huge mistake", he argues that the US should have focused on Tehran rather than Baghdad and suggests that "we can best attack the enemy alliance at its weakest point, the failure of the Iranian revolution." He advocates an attack that "should be political not military", concentrated on supporting the Iranian opposition, and cites the fall of the Soviet Union as an example of this approach working.

Countries which are seen as weak on terrorism should be targeted for punitive action, in Flynn's view. He writes that "Countries like Pakistan need to be told that we will not tolerate" terrorist training camps, safe havens and funding. "They are going to have to choose, and if they continue to help the jihadis, we are going to treat them harshly, cutting them off from American assistance, and operating against enemy safe havens." The US should work with allies—Flynn specifically names Israel, Jordan, Egypt, Poland, Hungary, Czech Republic, India, Argentina, Britain, Australia, France, Germany and Italy—to weaken, overthrow or defeat jihadism and enemy regimes.

=== Proposed political war ===
The authors' proposed two-track approach would also see a political war to discredit both "Radical Islam" and what they regard as anti-Western dictatorships. Flynn argues that the United States is engaged in a religious war and sees this as an essential component of winning the fight, citing the outcome of the Protestant Reformation. He writes: "This kind of war is not at all new. It created our world ... The world badly needs an Islamic Reformation, and we should not be surprised if violence is involved. It's normal."

The book urges the United States to define the enemy more clearly, declaring that "[w]e've got to stop feeling the slightest bit guilty about calling them by name and identifying them as fanatical killers acting on behalf of a failed civilization". Flynn says that he does not "believe all cultures are morally equivalent, and I think the West, and especially America, is far more civilized, far more ethical and moral, than the system our main enemies want to impose on us." He describes jihadists as a "tribal cult" and "a messianic mass movement of evil people" who are waging "a global war ... waged against us by all true Radical Islamists in the name of Allah." He compares the situation to that which the West faced in World War II and the Cold War, when ideology was an integral part of the struggle against Nazism and Communism, and argues: "We can't win this war by treating Radical Islamic terrorists as a handful of crazies ... The political and theological underpinnings of their immoral actions have to be demolished."

The means by which this should be done, according to Flynn, include a range of ideological counter-measures. Tech companies such as Google, Facebook and Twitter should undertake "their own positive messaging campaign about the betterment of humankind" (though Flynn does not define the specifics of this). Ideological messages should also accompany military operations; successful actions should be followed by messages "asking whether the Almighty had changed sides in the holy war. After all, if previous victories were the result of divine blessing, were defeats not proof that their cause had been rejected on high?" While acknowledging that such actions may incur accusations of Islamophobia, Flynn asserts that the real problem is politically correct Islamophilia: "If, as PC apologists tell us, there is no objective basis for members of one culture to criticize another, then it is very hard to see—and forbidden to write about or say—the existence of an international alliance of evil countries and movements that is working to destroy us."

Flynn summarises his plan of action as being to "engage the violent extremists wherever they are, drive them from their safe havens, and kill them or capture them". He argues that the US has to "organize all our national power, from military and economic to intelligence and tough-minded diplomacy" but warns that the struggle is likely to be costly and will last "several generations". The strategy should "clearly define your enemy; face reality—for politicians, this is never an easy thing to do; understand the social context and fabric of the operational environment; and recognize who's in charge of the enemy forces."

Changes to the US government's approach to intelligence and security should also be made, according to Flynn. He advocates an end to government agencies' overlapping efforts on cybersecurity, which he attributes to their desire to gain as much bureaucratic turf and federal money as possible. On intelligence, he draws on his experience of countering the Iraqi insurgency to make the case for working much more closely with local allies: "both the information and the strategy come from the people—the citizens of these countries—caught up in the war itself. We must work closely with those people. They have crucial information, and they will determine who wins."

== Reactions ==
The book received mixed, and generally politically polarized, reviews. Several reviewers found the book unsatisfactory for its contradictions. William McCants of the Brookings Institution's Center for Middle East Policy describes the book's argument as "muddled", commenting that "[i]t's strange to find a book about strategy so at odds with itself." He notes that while it offers "two very different views of how to exercise American power abroad", its contradictory perspectives leave the reader unable to decide between them. Another Brookings Institution scholar, Thomas Wright, suggests that the book's contradictions reflect diverging viewpoints between the two authors. Christopher J. Fettweis notes in The National Interest that the book strongly reflects Michael Ledeen's "oft-expressed worldview" and wonders how much Flynn had to do with it. Writing in The Washington Post, Carlos Lozoda comments that the book reflects two sides of Flynn—"respected intelligence officer" and "rabid and influential partisan". It "oscillat[es] between straightforward analysis and vague, impassioned diatribes, untroubled by contradictions or evolutions."

Flynn's proposals and assertions were also criticized by reviewers and commentators. Shamir Shahidshaless comments in Gulf News that Flynn "simplistically ignores a complex collection of political, economic and military failures" that caused the Soviet collapse and assumes falsely that it was simply Western support for internal dissent that was decisive. Lozoda characterizes Flynn's proposed strategy as "a generic jumble of buzzwords". In Wright's view, it is "a mystery what could motivate a foreign policy professional to espouse such views or what practical policy agenda could possibly emerge from them." The Economist criticized Flynn for "grossly exaggerating the danger that jihadist terrorism actually represents to America". The Chinese government, which has faced Islamist violence in its western region of Xinjiang, also pushed back on Flynn's assertions of an alliance between China and al Qaeda/ISIS. A foreign ministry spokesman urged people to "base their opinions on facts when taking a position."

A number of conservative commentators praised The Field of Fight. Diana Furchtgott-Ross of the Manhattan Institute writes in the National Review that "if you wish to understand the terrorist attacks sweeping the world, there's no better place to start than The Field of Fight" and called it a must-read for both Donald Trump and Hillary Clinton, and their respective military advisers. In the New York Observer, Jason Criss Howk calls the book "concise and straight to the point" while conceding that the authors "use some terminology I, as a Middle East specialist, don't agree with", specifically in conflating "radical Islam" and "radical Islamism". Nonetheless he describes the book's proposals as "spot on and [they] create a recipe for upgrading our capabilities". Caroline Glick of the Jerusalem Post praises the book as "a breath of fresh air in the acrid intellectual environment that Washington has become during the Obama administration" and says that it contributes "essential insights to the discussion of the global jihad".

Not all conservatives were supportive of the book. Daniel Larison of The American Conservative called its worldview "deranged", describing its identification of a "non-existent 'global alliance'" as foolish, dangerous, grossly exaggerated and distorted. He summed it up as "reheated Cheneyism with a dollop of Santorumesque hyperbole".
