= Center for Family and Human Rights =

American nonprofit organization

Center for Family and Human Rights Institute
- Founded: 1997
- Type: 501(c)(3) organization
- Tax ID no.: 13-3964076
- Purpose: Social policy Lobbying; Anti-abortion; Anti-LGBT
- Location: New York City/Washington, D.C., U.S.
- Region served: Worldwide; United States
- Key people: Austin Ruse, President; Lisa Correnti, Executive Vice President
- Website: www.c-fam.org

The Center for Family and Human Rights (C-Fam) is a right-wing United States–based advocacy group, founded in 1997, in order to affect policy debate at the United Nations and other international institutions. It was formerly known as the Catholic Family and Human Rights Institute. The 501(c)(3) organization is anti-abortion and anti-LGBT.

== History ==
The Catholic Family & Human Rights Institute was formally incorporated on 11 August 1997 in Suffolk County, New York, with three directors - Seth Perlman, Clifford Perlman and Jane Burke-Robertson Initially nicknamed CAFHRI, the group was founded as an independent non-profit corporation by Human Life International-Canada and then with ongoing support from the headquarters of Human Life International (HLI), based in Front Royal, Virginia. Later nicknamed C-Fam, which subsequently became the group's corporate name, part of the group's mission was to work closely with the Holy See delegation at the UN. Austin Ruse subsequently replaced Anne Noonan as Director and shortly thereafter became president.

In July 2013, Ruse was identified as a key member of Groundswell, a coalition of conservative activists and journalists attempting to make political change within the United States from behind the scenes. Ruse is also the author of two books; Fake Science: Exposing the Left's Skewed Statistics, Fuzzy Facts, and Dodgy Data, published by Regnery, and Littlest Suffering Souls: Children Whose Short Lives Point Us to Christ, published by TAN Books.

In 2015, Monsignor Anthony Frontiero resigned from the organization's board of directors in protest when Ruse commented "The hard-left human-hating people that run modern universities should be taken out and shot." Ruse said this was a figure of speech and issued a formal apology.

The Center for Family and Human Rights is a member of the advisory board of Project 2025, a collection of conservative and right-wing policy proposals from the Heritage Foundation to reshape the United States federal government and consolidate executive power should the Republican nominee win the 2024 presidential election.

== NGO at the United Nations ==
In February, 2014, the 19-member NGO Committee of the United Nations Economic and Social Council (ECOSOC) unanimously approved C-Fam for Special Consultative Status. On April 23, 2014, the ECOSOC granted this status without objection.

Jessica Stern of the LGBT rights advocacy group OutRight Action International, commenting on C-FAM's United Nations mission, said that the organization "regularly releases homophobic vitriol". The civil rights advocacy organization Southern Poverty Law Center (SPLC) has listed C-Fam as an anti-LGBT hate group, and pointed out that Ruse supports the criminalization of homosexuality.

In 2015, Stefano Gennarini (Director of the Centre for Legal Studies at C-Fam) publicly criticised Bishop Marcelo Sánchez Sorondo, chancellor of the Pontifical Academy of Social Sciences and the Pontifical Academy of Sciences in the Vatican, by accusing him of opposing the negotiating position of the Holy See on the issue of sexual and reproductive health. He also went on to accuse economist Jeffrey Sachs, director of the Earth Institute at Columbia University and a senior UN advisor, and UN Secretary-General Ban Ki-moon of actively promoting abortion. This received a strong rebuke from Professor Margaret Archer of the University of Warwick, president of the Pontifical Academy of Social Sciences, who referred to "distorted criticism" and raised concern at Gennarini's "understanding of Catholic Social Doctrine”. This, in turn, drew a rebuke from influential Catholic journalist Phil Lawler who wrote, "Archer’s ad hominem approach, and her unwillingness to engage the real issues in the debate, were unworthy of a social scientist. Her uncharitable attitude is unworthy of someone representing the Holy See."

The London-based Guardian newspaper reported in May 2019 that C-Fam has "emerged from the extreme right fringe on abortion, sexual orientation and gender identity to become a powerful player behind the scenes at the UN. With a modest budget and a six-strong staff led by the president Austin Ruse, it has leveraged connections inside the Trump administration to enforce a rigid orthodoxy on social issues, and helped build a new US coalition with mostly autocratic regimes that share a similar outlook."

Prior to the beginning of the 2026 UN Commission on the Status of Women, the Guardian described C-Fam as "one of the powerful anti-rights bodies that will be lobbying the UN at CSW this week."

Reuters has reported, "Emails and memos from U.S. officials at the U.N. obtained by Reuters show the influence of the Center for Family and Human Rights, or C-Fam, a private U.S. research institute formed to affect policy at the U.N. to align with conservative Catholic views."

== Staff ==
Besides Ruse, who is the president of the organization, C-FAM staff members include:

- Lisa Correnti, Executive Vice President
- Stefano Gennarini, Vice President for the Center of Legal Studies
- Rebecca Oas, Director of Research

== See also ==
- List of organizations designated by the Southern Poverty Law Center as anti-LGBT hate groups
