= Michael Ledeen =

American historian and foreign policy analyst (1941–2025)

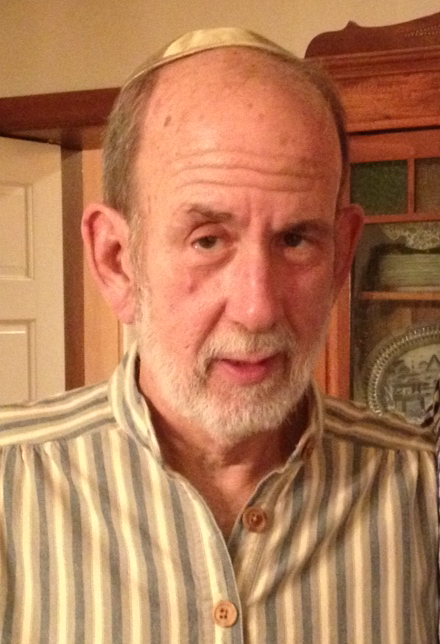
- Born: Michael Arthur Ledeen; August 1, 1941; Los Angeles, California, U.S.
- Died: May 18, 2025 (aged 83); Austin, Texas, U.S.
- Education: Pomona College (BA); University of Wisconsin, Madison (PhD)

Michael Arthur Ledeen (/ləˈdiːn/; August 1, 1941 – May 18, 2025) was an American scholar and neoconservative foreign policy analyst. He was a consultant to the United States National Security Council, the U.S. Department of State, and the U.S. Department of Defense. He held the Freedom Scholar chair at the American Enterprise Institute where he was a scholar for 20 years, and also held the similarly named chair at the Foundation for Defense of Democracies. He was very close to Italian politician Antonio Martino. Ledeen was also noted to have done work for Italian intelligence agency SISMI, having received over $100,000 in payment to offshore bank accounts for services including but not limited to training Italian intelligence operatives. Ledeen denied these allegations but admitted that he did do work for SISMI and was paid for it.

== Academic career ==
Ledeen earned a bachelor's in history from Pomona College in 1962 and a doctorate in history and philosophy from the University of Wisconsin, Madison in 1969, where he studied under the historian George Mosse. His doctoral dissertation eventually became Universal Fascism: The Theory and Practice of the Fascist International, 1928–1936, first published in 1972, which explored Italian leader Benito Mussolini's efforts to create a Fascist international in the late 1920s and early 1930s. Ledeen taught at Washington University in St. Louis but left after being denied tenure. Some faculty indicated that questions about the "quality of his scholarship" and about whether or not Ledeen had "used the work of somebody else without proper credit" were issues, although some also noted that "the 'quasi-irregularity' at issue didn't warrant the negative vote on tenure."

Ledeen subsequently moved to Rome, where he was hired as the Rome correspondent for The New Republic and was named a visiting professor at the University of Rome for two years until 1977. In Rome, Ledeen worked with Italian historian Renzo De Felice, who greatly influenced Ledeen, drawing a distinction between "fascism-regime" and "fascism-movement." Ledeen's political views developed to stress "the urgency of combating centralized state power and the centrality of human freedom" Ledeen continued his studies in Italian Fascism with a study of the takeover of Fiume by Italian irredentist forces under Gabriele d'Annunzio, who Ledeen argued was the prototype for Mussolini.

== Billygate ==
In the 1980 lead up to the US presidential election, Ledeen, along with Arnaud de Borchgrave, wrote a series of articles published in The New Republic and elsewhere about Jimmy Carter's brother, Billy Carter's contacts with the Muammar al-Gaddafi regime in Libya. Ledeen testified before a Senate subcommittee that he believed that Billy Carter had met with and been paid off by Yasser Arafat of the Palestine Liberation Organization.

Five years later, in 1985, a Wall Street Journal investigation suggested that the series of Billygate articles written by Ledeen were part of a larger disinformation campaign intended to influence the outcome of that year's presidential election. According to the reporting, Francesco Pazienza, an officer of the Italian intelligence agency SISMI, alleged that Ledeen was paid $120,000 for his work on Billygate and other projects. Pazienza and Ledeen were very active in disinformation efforts. At SISMI, Pazienza stated, Ledeen warranted a coded identification: Z-3. Pazienza was later tried and convicted in absentia for using "extortion and fraud to obtain embarrassing facts about Billy Carter". (Note: According to both Boris Yuzhin and Oleg Gordievsky, the KGB conducted a large disinformation campaign in support of Republicans and Ronald Reagan to discredit Democrats and Jimmy Carter during the 1980 elections.)

== Bulgarian connection theory ==
Ledeen worked for the Italian military intelligence agency SISMI in 1980, providing "risk assessment" and consulting on extradition matters between Italy and the United States. During his time in Italy, Ledeen endorsed the "Bulgarian connection" conspiracy theory concerning Grey Wolves member Mehmet Ali Ağca's 1981 attempt to assassinate Pope John Paul II. The theory has since been attacked by various authors and journalists, including Washington Post reporter Michael Dobbs, who initially believed the story as well. The theory was adopted in 2005 by the Italian Mitrokhin Commission. According to Craig Unger, "With Ronald Reagan newly installed in the White House, the so-called Bulgarian Connection made perfect Cold War propaganda. Michael Ledeen was one of its most vocal proponents, promoting it on TV and in newspapers all over the world."

== Work in the United States ==
In the early 1980s, Ledeen appeared before the newly established Senate Subcommittee on Security and Terrorism alongside former CIA director William Colby, author Claire Sterling, and former Newsweek editor Arnaud de Borchgrave. Both Ledeen and de Borchgrave worked for the Center for Strategic and International Studies at Georgetown University at the time. All four testified that they believed the Soviet Union had provided material support, training and inspiration for various terrorist groupings.

Ledeen was involved in the Iran–Contra affair as a consultant to National Security Advisor Robert C. McFarlane. Ledeen met with Israeli prime minister Shimon Peres, officials of the Israeli Foreign Ministry, and the CIA to arrange meetings with high-ranking Iranian officials, whereby Iranians supported by the US would be given weapons by Israel, and would proceed to negotiate with Hizbollah for the release of hostages in Lebanon. Ledeen's own version of the events is published in his book, Perilous Statecraft.

Ledeen vouched for Iranian intermediary Manucher Ghorbanifar. According to Adnan Khashoggi in 1985, Ghorbanifar was the head of Iranian Prime Minister Mir Hussein Mousavi's European intelligence and Ledeen was aware of this. In one interview after the scandal broke, Ledeen stated that he initially had "profound reservations" about Ghorbanifar, but that he proved himself to be reliable by opening a channel to Iranian leaders. In another report in which he was described as "perhaps the only person on the US side of the affair to defend Ghorbanifar", he said that he considered Ghorbanifar to be a friend.

== Yellowcake forgery allegations ==
During the summer of 2001, Alain Chouet and others with France's DGSE investigated an alleged deal known later as Nigergate in which Iraq was trying to obtain yellowcake from a country in Africa and, by May and June 2002, they were investigating any connection with Niger, but found that the rumors were entirely false. Furthermore, in July 2002 the Italian SISMI and the CIA were informed by the French DGSE that Rocco Martino, a former Italian intelligence agent, was trying to pass fake documents about Iraq obtaining yellowcake from Niger. However, the SISMI reported that a woman, controlled by SISMI's Antonio Nucera, presented the fake documents in July 2002 at the Niger embassy at Rome. Later, in March 2003 George Tenet incorrectly stated that Iraq, which had large quantities of yellowcake, was obtaining yellowcake from Niger.

According to a September 2004 article by Joshua Micah Marshall, Laura Rozen, and Paul Glastris in Washington Monthly: "The first meeting occurred in Rome in December, 2001. It included Franklin, Rhode, and another American, the neoconservative writer and operative Michael Ledeen, who organized the meeting. (According to UPI, Ledeen was then working for Undersecretary of Defense Douglas Feith as a consultant.) Also in attendance was Ghorbanifar and a number of other Iranians."

Colleagues Andrew McCarthy and Mark R. Levin have defended Ledeen, writing: "Up until now, the fiction recklessly spewed by disgruntled intelligence-community retirees and their media enablers—some of whom have conceded that the claim is based on zero evidence—has been that Michael had something to do with the forged Italian documents that, according to the Left's narrative, were the basis for President Bush's "lie" in the 2003 State of the Union Address that Saddam Hussein had obtained yellowcake uranium (for nuclear-weapons construction) in Africa."

== Iraq War advocacy ==
During the 1990s, Ledeen was active in supporting the ousting of Saddam Hussein from Iraq. He was known as one of The Vulcans who also included John Bolton, Douglas Feith, Richard Perle, Paul Wolfowitz, Donald Rumsfeld, and David Wurmser who signed "An Open Letter to the President" to lobby Bill Clinton to remove Hussein from office.

Regarding the "pre-emptive" invasion of Iraq, in 2002 Ledeen criticized the views of former National Security Adviser Brent Scowcroft, writing:

Scowcroft has managed to get one thing half right, even though he misdescribes it. He fears that if we attack Iraq "I think we could have an explosion in the Middle East. It could turn the whole region into a caldron and destroy the War on Terror." One can only hope that we turn the region into a cauldron, and faster, please. If ever there were a region that richly deserved being cauldronized, it is the Middle East today. If we wage the war effectively, we will bring down the terror regimes in Iraq, Iran, and Syria, and either bring down the Saudi monarchy or force it to abandon its global assembly line to indoctrinate young terrorists. That's our mission in the war against terror.

— Michael Ledeen

Prior to the start of the Iraq war, Ledeen called it a "desperately needed and long overdue war against Saddam Hussein" and that there was a "dire need to invade Iraq". This caused Glenn Greenwald to condemn a later statement by Ledeen that he had "opposed the military invasion of Iraq before it took place" as an "outright lie". Ledeen maintained that his statements were nonetheless consistent, noting that "I opposed the military invasion of Iraq before it took place and I advocated—as I still do—support for political revolution in Iran as the logical and necessary first step in the war against the terror masters."

== Views on Iran ==
Ledeen was a long-time foe of the Islamic regime of Iran. He believed that invading the country and regime change in Iran should have been the first priority in the "war on terror" in 2003 rather than Iraq. He believed that "everything traces back to Tehran" and that Iran manipulates both sides of the Shi'ite-Sunni conflict, leading reviewer Peter Beinart to note that his "effort to lay virtually every attack by Muslims against Americans at Tehran's feet takes him into rather bizarre territory." The New York Times describes Ledeen's views as "everything traces back to Tehran". Ledeen's phrase, "faster, please" has become a signature meme in his writings (it was the title of his blog on the Pajamas Media website) and is often referenced by neoconservative writers advocating a more forceful and broader "war on terror". In 1979, Ledeen was one of the first Western writers to argue that Ayatollah Ruhollah Khomeini was a "clerical fascist", and that while it was legitimate to criticize the Shah's regime, if Khomeini seized power in Iran the Iranian people would suffer an even greater loss of freedom and women would be deprived of political and social rights. He believed that "No one in the West has yet supported Iranian democratic organizations" and that "aggressive support for those Iranians who wish to be free" would most likely work in ending the clerical government.

According to Justin Raimondo, Ledeen "holds up Bill Clinton and Madeleine Albright as patsies for Khomeini—who supposedly believed that the Ayatollah overthrew Shah Reza Pahlavi because the Iranian government was 'excessively repressive and intolerant.' While it would not do to come right out and deny the savagery of the Shah's legendary SAVAK secret police, Ledeen informs us that, under the monarch's beneficent rule, 'Iran had become too modern, too tolerant—especially of women and of other religious faiths—and too self-indulgent. The shah had Westernized Iran'—except, perhaps, in his prisons, where the ancient methods of torture were routinely employed on dissidents of all sorts."

Ledeen was at the time of his death against both an invasion of Iran or air-strikes within the country. He argued that the latter may eventually become necessary if negotiations with the Iranian government fail, but it would only be the least bad option of many options and it would lead to many negative unforeseen consequences. The New York Times called Ledeen's skepticism towards military action against Iran surprising given his opposition to the regime.

In July 2016 Ledeen co-authored with Lt. General Michael T. Flynn, at the time Donald Trump's national-security adviser, The Field of Fight: How We Can Win the Global War Against Radical Islam and Its Allies. Flynn and Ledeen constructed a narrative in which the world was at war with a "great evil" and Iran was the central player on the enemy side.

== Controversial theories ==
Ledeen also believed that Iran is the main backer of the insurgency in Iraq and even supported the al-Qaida network formerly led by al-Zarqawi despite its declaration of jihad against Shi'ite Muslims. He claimed that German and Italian court documents showed Zarqawi created a European terrorist network while based in Tehran.

Ledeen was a board member of the "Coalition for Democracy in Iran" (CDI), founded by Morris Amitay, a former executive director of American Israel Public Affairs Committee (AIPAC). Ledeen had also been part of the board of the U.S. Committee for a Free Lebanon. According to The Washington Post, quoted by Asia Times, he was the only full-time international affairs analyst regularly consulted by Karl Rove, George W. Bush's closest advisor.

Following the February 2003 speech by French Minister for Foreign Affairs Dominique de Villepin at the United Nations General Assembly against the intervention in Iraq, Ledeen outlined, in a column entitled "A Theory," a possibility that France and Germany, both NATO allies of the U.S., "struck a deal with radical Islam and with radical Arabs" to use "extremism and terrorism as the weapon of choice" to weaken the U.S. He stated, "It sounds fanciful, to be sure," but that, "If this is correct, we will have to pursue the war against terror far beyond the boundaries of the Middle East, into the heart of Western Europe. And there, as in the Middle East, our greatest weapons are political: the demonstrated desire for freedom of the peoples of the countries that oppose us."

Jonah Goldberg, Ledeen's colleague at National Review, coined the term "Ledeen Doctrine" in a 2002 column. Goldberg recalled that his tongue-in-cheek expression had been summarized in one of Ledeen's early 1990s speeches as "Every ten years or so, the United States needs to pick up some small crappy little country and throw it against the wall, just to show the world we mean business," as Goldberg remembered Ledeen saying in an early 1990s speech.

Ledeen also advocated that U.S. leaders take a stronger rhetorical stance in wars on Islamic regimes and militant groups. For instance, he recommended in public talks that U.S. leaders question or challenge defeated Islamic militaries or forces and even suggest the apparent failure of Allah to assure their victory.

== Personal life ==
Ledeen was born in Los Angeles, California.

His first wife was Jenny Ledeen of St. Louis, Missouri.

At the time of his death, Ledeen was married to his second wife, Barbara, who was a longtime staffer for Senator Chuck Grassley on the Senate Judiciary Committee until early 2021, when she retired from the Senate, and with whom he had three children: Simone, Gabriel, and Daniel. Simone has worked both in Iraq and Afghanistan for the Department of Defense; Gabriel is currently working for an e-commerce company; Daniel too is currently a lieutenant in the USMC.

Ledeen was an accomplished contract bridge player, having won one American Contract Bridge League national-level tournament, the 2009 Senior Swiss Teams, on a team-of-four with Karen Allison, Lea Dupont and Benito Garozzo. He also partnered with Jimmy Cayne, who oversaw the collapse of Bear Stearns firm in 2007 and 2008. Consulted by a New York Times journalist early in the episode, Ledeen suggested that his book on the leadership lessons of Machiavelli had influenced Cayne, and observed that "Jimmy saw himself in Machiavelli ... you have to get rid of failure and you have to punish lack of virtue ruthlessly and all the time."

Ledeen died from complications of multiple strokes in Austin, Texas, on May 18, 2025, at the age of 83.

=== Missing Clinton emails ===
Barbara Ledeen sparked controversy in 2015 when she tried to launch her own investigation into Hillary Clinton's emails while a staff member for Senator Chuck Grassley. The senator then served on the Judiciary Committee looking into Russian interference in the 2016 elections. According to FBI notes, Mrs. Ledeen requested the assistance of both a defense contractor and Newt Gingrich, who asked Judicial Watch for financial assistance for her efforts. Judicial Watch requested another contractor to access the "deep web and dark web". One of Gingrich's closest aides, Peter W. Smith, had approached Matt Tate, a former British intelligence official, about the matter. Smith was also working with Michael Flynn, a confidant of Michael Ledeen. After Tate discovered that Smith was obtaining Clinton's emails independently of Barbara Ledeen's efforts, Grassley told her to stop her investigation. (Note: On September 10, 2019, at Venice, Italy during the 58th Venice Biennale which was directed by the Hayward Gallery in London's curator Ralph Rugoff, Hillary Clinton visited the Kenneth Goldsmith work "Hillary: The Hillary Clinton Emails," a work on display in a balcony jutting out over a supermarket at the Despar Teatro Italia. During Clinton's appearance, she said that the attention given to her emails was one of the "strangest" and most "absurd" events in U.S. political history, adding, "Anyone can go in and look at them. There is nothing there. There is nothing that should have been so controversial." During the 2019 Venice Biennale which was glamorous with a joie de vivre and contained art of historical importance, the emails were exhibited from May 9, 2019, until November 24, 2019, during which Goldsmith promoted them as "the most important political documents of our times." Even though Attorney General Loretta Lynch had closed the Hillary Clinton email investigation case during summer of 2016 without criminal charges, during his campaign on October 28, 2016, Trump commented about Clinton's emails as "This is bigger than Watergate. This is bigger than Watergate. In my opinion. This is bigger than Watergate." After Trump's statement, James Comey publicly stated that he had the FBI open another investigation into Clinton just days before the November 8, 2016, elections which Clinton felt buried her hopes of becoming president.)

=== Project Veritas ===
To support Project Veritas in 2017 and 2018 while a staff member on the Senate Judiciary Committee led by Chuck Grassley, Barbara Ledeen was tasked with helping to discredit H. R. McMaster, who had stated that President Trump had the intelligence of a "kindergartner" and was an "idiot". She posted numerous comments on Facebook supporting Project Veritas—including "We owe a lot to Erik Prince" (Note: Erik Prince is a staunch supporter of the national security interests of the People's Republic of China (PRC)'s Ministry of State Security according to a January 2014 Wall Street Journal article.) because of his efforts to support Project Veritas— as well disparaging posts about McMaster himself. Barbara Ledeen's involvement in the campaign to discredit McMaster led to her being named as a member of the Groundswell group; she admitted passing on information to Project Veritas but said "I am not part of a plot."

== Bibliography ==
- Universal Fascism; the Theory and Practice of the Fascist International, 1928–1936, New York, H. Fertig, 1972
- co-written with Renzo De Felice: Fascism: An Informal Introduction To Its Theory And Practice, New Brunswick, NJ: Transaction Books, 1976 ISBN 0-87855-190-5.
- "Renzo De Felice and the Controversy over Italian Fascism", pages 269–283 from Journal of Contemporary History, Volume 11, 1976.
- The First Duce: D'Annunzio at Fiume, Baltimore; London: Johns Hopkins University Press, 1977 ISBN 0-8018-1860-5.
- Italy In Crisis, Beverly Hills [Calif.]: Sage publications, 1977 ISBN 0-8039-0792-3.
- co-written with George Mosse: Intervista sul Nazismo, Rome-Bari, Laterza, 1977
- co-written with William Lewis: Debacle, The American Failure in Iran, Vintage Books; 1st Vintage Books ed. (1982) ISBN 0-394-75182-5
- Grave New World, New York: Oxford University Press, 1985 ISBN 0-19-503491-0.
- West European Communism and American Foreign Policy, New Brunswick: Transaction Books, 1987 ISBN 0-88738-140-5.
- Perilous Statecraft: An Insider's Account of the Iran-Contra Affair, New York: Scribner, 1988 ISBN 0-684-18994-1.
- Superpower Dilemmas: the U.S. and the U.S.S.R. at Century's End, New Brunswick: Transaction Publishers, 1992 ISBN 0-88738-891-4.
- Freedom Betrayed: How America Led a Global Democratic Revolution, Won the Cold War, and Walked Away, Washington, D.C.: AEI Press, 1996 ISBN 0-8447-3992-8.
- Machiavelli on Modern Leadership: Why Machiavelli's Iron Rules Are As Timely and Important Today as Five Centuries Ago, New York: Truman Talley Books/St. Martin's Press, 1999 ISBN 0-312-20471-X.
- The War against The Terror Masters: Why It Happened, Where We Are Now, How We'll Win, New York: St. Martin's Press, 2002 ISBN 0-312-30644-X.
- The Iranian Time Bomb: The Mullah Zealots' Quest for Destruction. Truman Talley Books, 2007. ISBN 0-312-37655-3. ISBN 978-0-312-37655-0.
- Obama's Betrayal of Israel, New York: Encounter Broadsides, 2010 ISBN 978-1594034626
- The Field of Fight: How We Can Win the Global War Against Radical Islam and Its Allies co-written with Lt. General Michael T. Flynn, New York: St. Martin's Press, 2016 ISBN 978-1-25010-622-3.

== See also ==
- Timeline of Russian interference in the 2016 United States elections
- Timeline of Russian interference in the 2016 United States elections (July 2016 – election day)

== Sources ==
- Bonini, Carlo [in Italian]; D'Avanzo, Giuseppe [in Italian] (April 11, 2007). Collusion: International Espionage and the War on Terror. Melville House Publishing. ISBN 9781933633275.
