= Gerhard Fettweis =

German telecommunications engineer and university professor

Gerhard Paul Fettweis (born March 16, 1962, in Wilrijk) is a German electrical engineer and university professor for telecommunications engineering.

Gerhard's father Alfred Fettweis invented the Wave Digital Filter. With a scholarship from the prestigious Studienstiftung des deutschen Volkes, Gerhard Fettweis studied electrical engineering at RWTH Aachen University from 1981 to 1986, and received his Dr.-Ing. (PhD in engineering) degree there in 1990. He then worked as a visiting scholar with IBM and TCSI Inc. in Berkeley. Since 1994, he has been holding the Vodafone Chair for Mobile Communications Systems at Dresden University of Technology.

== Awards ==
- In 2009, he was honored with Fellow membership of the IEEE for contributions to signal processing algorithms and chip implementation architectures for communications.
- In 2016, he became a member of the German National Academy of Sciences Leopoldina.
- In 2026, he was announced as the recipient of the 2027 IEEE Eric E. Sumner Award, "for contributions to physical layer communication technology with impact on the global wireless industry".
