= Alfred Fettweis =

Belgian-born German electrical engineer

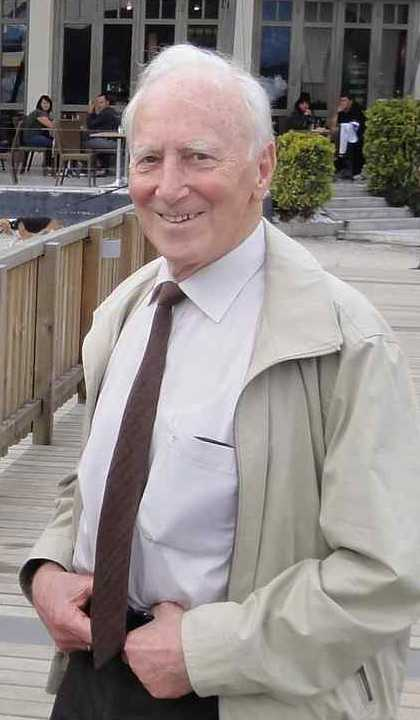
- Fettweis in Klagenfurt 2011
- Born: Alfred Leo Maria Fettweis; November 27, 1926; Eupen, Belgium
- Died: August 20, 2015 (aged 88); Bochum, Germany
- Education: Université catholique de Louvain; Columbia University; Polytechnic Institute of Brooklyn
- Known for: Wave digital filter
- Scientific career
- Fields: Electrical engineering, Digital signal processing
- Workplaces: Eindhoven University of Technology; Ruhr University Bochum; University of Notre Dame

Alfred Leo Maria Fettweis (27 November 1926 – 20 August 2015) was a Belgian-born German engineering scientist and communications engineer. He is known for inventing the wave digital filter. He was professor of Communication engineering at Ruhr University Bochum and a founding member of its Faculty of Electrical Engineering and Information Technology. Fettweis was elected to several academies, including the North Rhine-Westphalian Academy of Sciences, Humanities and the Arts, the Academia Europaea, the European Academy of Sciences and Arts and acatech, and was a Life Fellow of the IEEE.

== Life ==
Alfred Fettweis was born in 1926 in Eupen, Belgium. He was the second of three children of the agricultural engineer Paul Fettweis (1886–1964) and his wife Helene, née Hermanns, who worked as a pharmacy assistant. He was a grandson of the Eupen dye works owner Leo Fettweis (1841–1922) and a nephew of the mathematician Ewald Fettweis.

From 1946 to 1951 Fettweis studied electrical engineering at the Université catholique de Louvain (UCLouvain) in Leuven, and later at Columbia University and the Polytechnic Institute of Brooklyn in New York. After graduating as Ingénieur civil électricien, he worked from 1951 to 1963 as a development engineer for ITT Corporation in Antwerp and, from 1954 to 1956, in the United States. In 1963 he obtained the degree of Docteur en sciences appliquées at UCLouvain.

Also in 1963 he was appointed professor of theoretical electrical engineering at the Technical University of Eindhoven in the Netherlands. In 1967 he was appointed full professor (Ordinarius) of communication engineering at the newly founded Ruhr University Bochum, where he established the Chair of Communication Engineering and was one of the founding members of the Faculty of Electrical Engineering and Information Technology

In 1975, Fettweis became an ordinary member of the North Rhine-Westphalian Academy of Sciences, Humanities and the Arts. He was also a Life Fellow of the IEEE in New York, a member of the Academia Europaea in London (from 1992), of the European Academy of Sciences and Arts in Salzburg (from 1992), and of the German Academy of Science and Engineering in Munich (member of its predecessor Convent from 1997, acatech from 2002, DATW from 2008). He was a member of the Catholic guild Gilde Alfred Delp within the Cartell Rupert Mayer.

His teaching and research focused on circuit theory, systems theory, digital signal processing, wave digital filters, numerical integration of partial differential equations, and on relationships between communication engineering and fundamental questions in physics.

His son is the communications engineer Gerhard Fettweis.

== Honours and awards ==
- 1962–63: Prix Acta Technica Belgica, Belgium
- 1975: IEEE Fellow
- 1980: Prix 1980 de la Fondation Montefiore, Liège, Belgium
- 1980: Darlington Prize Paper Award, IEEE, United States
- 1984: VDE Ehrenring (VDE Ring of Honour), Germany
- 1984: Centennial Medal, United States
- 1986: Honorary doctorate Teknologie Doktor h.c. of Linköping University, Sweden
- 1986: Honorary doctorate Docteur honoris causa of the Faculté polytechnique de Mons, Belgium
- 1986: Honorary doctorate Doctor honoris causa of the Katholieke Universiteit Leuven, Belgium
- 1988: Technical Achievement Award, IEEE, United States
- 1988: Karl Küpfmüller Prize of the Information Technology Society in the VDE
- 1993: Peter Johns Prize of the International Journal of Numerical Modelling, United Kingdom
- 1994–1996: Visiting Distinguished Professor, Department of Computer Science and Engineering, University of Notre Dame, Indiana, United States
- 1995: Honorary doctorate Doctor honoris causa of the Budapest University of Technology and Economics, Hungary
- 1999: Golden Jubilee Award, IEEE
- 2000: Third Millennium Medal, United States
- 2001: Van Valkenburg Award, IEEE
- 2003: Vitold Belevitch Award, IEEE
- 2004: Honorary doctorate Doctor honoris causa of the Technical University of Poznań, Poland
- 2008: IEEE Gustav Robert Kirchhoff Award
- 2011: Honorary doctorate Dr.-Ing. E.h. of the University of Paderborn, Germany
