= Joseph Nimmich =

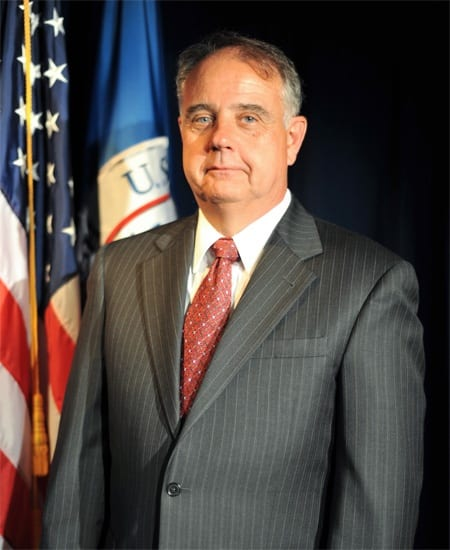

Deputy Administrator of the Federal Emergency Management Agency
- Incumbent
- Assumed office September 2014

Personal details
- Born: Joseph Lawrence Nimmich; 1955 (age 70–71) Huntington, New York, U.S.

Joseph Nimmich (born 1955) was the Deputy Administrator of the Federal Emergency Management Agency (FEMA) from September 2014 to January 2017. Before becoming the Deputy Administrator, he was Associate Administrator for the Office of Response and Recovery at FEMA. Nimmich received a master's degree in Business Administration from the Stern School of Business at New York University in 1988. He is also a graduate of the United States Army War College and the US Coast Guard Academy. Nimmich was commissioned as an ensign in 1977 and retired from the Coast Guard as a rear admiral in 2010. In 2018, Nimmich was elected as a fellow of the National Academy of Public Administration.
