= Groundswell (group) =

Group of American conservative activists and journalists

Groundswell, now called the Third Century Group (TC Group), is a coalition of prominent American conservative activists, led by Virginia Thomas (a lawyer and wife of Supreme Court Justice Clarence Thomas) and others, who began meeting in 2013 in order to fight progressivism in the United States and the Republican Party (GOP) establishment. Other members include John Bolton, Steve Bannon, Allen West, Mark Meadows, Sue Myrick, Frank Gaffney, Ken Blackwell, Jerry Boykin, Austin Ruse, Catherine Engelbrecht, Anita MonCrief, and Tom Fitton. Groundswell went on to be influential in the White House during Donald Trump's first term as president, conducting an effort to rid the White House and other government agencies of so-called "deep state" opponents of Trump.

According to leaked documents in 2013, the group had started staging "a 30 front war seeking to fundamentally transform the nation", by such goals as undermining the power of former GOP strategist and Fox News analyst Karl Rove, along with the 2012 Benghazi attack and the Operation Fast and Furious's gun-running issue, repealing the Affordable Care Act, working behind the scenes to enact voter ID laws, and blocking Obama administration nominees.

In 2021, Barbara Ledeen was named as a member of Groundswell in connection with her involvement in an undercover campaign by Project Veritas to discredit H. R. McMaster when he served as Trump's national security adviser in 2017 and 2018. Ledeen, longtime staffer for Senator Chuck Grassley on the Senate Judiciary Committee and wife of neoconservative foreign policy analyst Michael Ledeen, said she passed on information about McMaster's social calendar to Project Veritas which then used the information to plan an operation to secretly record McMaster making comments that would cause him to resign or be fired. Ledeen admitted passing on the information but said "I am not part of a plot."
