= Austin Ruse =

American political activist

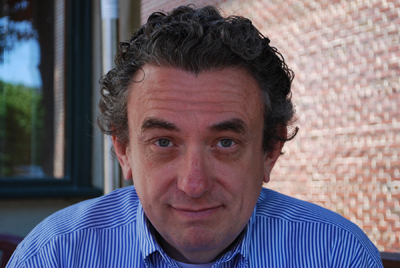
- Ruse in 2009
- Education: University of Missouri
- Occupations: Political activist, journalist, author
- Title: President, Center for Family and Human Rights
- Spouse: Cathy Cleaver Ruse

Austin Ruse is an American conservative political activist, journalist and author. He is the president of a nonprofit NGO, Center for Family and Human Rights (C-FAM), which is in Special Consultative Status with the UN Economic and Social Council. The group holds anti-abortion and anti-LGBT views.

== Career ==
After graduating from the University of Missouri, Ruse moved to Washington D.C. where he began work with American Film Magazine, a program of the American Film Institute. He moved to New York for AFI and opened their first New York office in Greenwich Village. From there he went to work --- in order --- with The Atlantic Monthly, Rolling Stone, Fortune Magazine and Forbes. In was in these years that he was recruited to join the nascent UN lobby group then known as the Catholic Family & Human Rights Institute, the name of which was eventually changed to the Center for Family & Human Rights.

In July 2013, Ruse was identified as a convener of a Groundswell coalition meeting among conservative activists and journalists.

== Books ==
Littlest Suffering Souls: Children Whose Short Lives Point Us to Christ (Tan Books, 2017) tells the story of three children who suffered greatly, died young, and brought many people to the faith. Included among the three children is Margaret Leo, the daughter of Leonard Leo.

Fake Science: Exposing the Left’s Skewed Statistics, Fuzzy Facts, and Dodgy Data (Regnery, 2017) where Ruse explores various scientific claims of the political left.

The Catholic Case for Trump (Regnery, 2020) in which Ruse argues that Catholics can in good conscience vote the Trump.

Under Siege: No Finer Time to be a Faithful Catholic (Crisis Books, 2021) in which Ruse argues that Catholic should embrace the current cultural and political challenges.

Not Just for Kings: Cultivating a 500-Year Vision for Your Family in which Ruse argues that everyday people can emulate nobles and kings in protecting and projecting their families through the ages, will be published by Sophia Institute Press on September 15, 2026.

== Journalism ==
Ruse was a founding columnist at The Catholic Thing and is currently a bi-weekly columnist at Crisis Magazine.

Ruse was a regular contributor to the media outlet Breitbart and was instrumental in encouraging Steve Bannon to get involved with Vatican reporting, which paved the way for the establishment of Breitbart's Rome bureau.

=== Education ===
Ruse earned a Bachelor of Arts degree in Political Science and a Bachelor of Journalism from the University of Missouri

=== Awards and honors ===
In 2004, Ruse and his wife were awarded the John Paul II Award for Advancing the culture of life from the Institute for the Psychological Sciences.

Ruse received an Honorary Doctorate from Franciscan University of Steubenville in 2003

== Views and controversies ==
Ruse stated that the "hard left, human-hating people that run modern universities... should all be taken out and shot" while hosting a radio talk show on American Family Radio in March 2014. Monsignor Anthony Frontiero of the St. Joseph Cathedral in Manchester, New Hampshire, resigned from the board of C-FAM because of Ruse's comments. The next day on the same radio program, he described Democrats "get[ting] into the ballot box" as "really dumb ... low-information voters."

After the fallout from his comments, AFR removed Ruse from their airwaves, stated that his views were "un-Christian", and scrubbed all of Ruse's shows from their online archives. Ruse also deactivated his Twitter account. Ruse stated on C-FAM's website later that week in which he said he regretted using the phrase "taken out and shot".

In 2020, Ruse criticized George Floyd and the Black Lives Matter movement, stating that Floyd's history of drug abuse led directly to his death. Following intervention from one of his publishers, he deleted the tweet. However, he later defended the original remark.

=== Anti-lgbt views ===
Ruse has published dozens of columns critical of the LGBT movement. He has criticized the movement for targeting school-age children.

Radical homosexuals... are coming for your daughter and your son and your grandchildren. They don't have any children of their own. They are deliberately barren. So, they have set their sights on yours, your innocent girls and boys.

— Austin Ruse addressing his followers in 2016

At the UN, Ruse and his group opposed the Human Rights Council's decision to investigate violence based on sexual orientation and gender identity. Ruse told the CPAC conference that year, the issue was not violence against LBGTs but rather an attempt to place "sexual orientation and gender identity" as new categories of non-discrimination in international law. The Advocate has described Ruse as "fanatically anti-gay", stating that he has supported legislation in Russia to keep homosexual propaganda away from school children. He has argued that most Americans would like to see a similar approach in the US.

Ruse is a longtime critic of Jesuit priest James Martin for his pro-lgbt advocacy. Writer Michael Sean Winters described Ruse's attacks as "vulgar and childish".

=== Support for Donald Trump ===
Ruse supported Trump through all three of his runs for president. He has argued that Trump "more closely adheres to Catholic social teaching than Joe Biden".

In 2020, Ruse was charged with mocking the stutter of a 13-year-old child appearing during the 2020 Democratic Convention on Twitter, something Ruse vehemently denies. The charge was later retracted. During the same controversy, he claimed that Joe Biden never had a stutter. One of C-FAM's board members resigned over the incident.

== Personal life ==
Raised Methodist, Ruse converted to Catholicism. He is a supernumerary member of Opus Dei, a personal prelature of the Catholic Church.
