= Arlene Wohlgemuth =

American politician (born 1947)

Arlene Reid Wohlgemuth

Member of the Texas House of Representatives from the 58th district
- In office 1995–2005
- Preceded by: Bernard Erickson
- Succeeded by: Rob Orr

Personal details
- Born: July 16, 1947 (age 79) Midland, Texas, U.S.
- Spouse: Mikeal Wohlgemuth
- Children: 2
- Education: Texas Tech University (1965–1967)
- Occupation: Former executive director of Texas Public Policy Foundation in Austin

Arlene Reid Wohlgemuth (born July 16, 1947) is a former Republican member of the Texas House of Representatives from District 58 in Johnson and Bosque counties south of Fort Worth, Texas.

Wohlgemuth served in the 74th Texas Legislature through 78th Texas Legislatures. In 1997, she became involved in what was called the "Memorial Day Massacre." She raised a point of order that killed fifty-two proposed bills by preventing them from coming up for a vote before the end of the legislative session. Wohlgemuth was angry that opposition legislators had used a similar procedure the week before to prevent a vote on a proposal supported by Wohlgemuth to require parental notification if a minor procures an abortion.

Preceded by Bernard Erickson	Member of the Texas House of Representatives from District 58 (Burleson); 1995–2005	Succeeded by Rob Orr
