= High Performance Computing Collaboratory =

The High Performance Computing Collaboratory (HPC²) at Mississippi State University, an evolution of the MSU/National Science Foundation Engineering Research Center for Computational Field Simulation, is a coalition of member centers and institutes that share a common core objective of advancing the state-of-the-art in computational science and engineering using high performance computing; a common approach to research that embraces a multi-disciplinary, team-oriented concept; and a commitment to a full partnership between education, research, and service. The mission of the HPC² is to serve the University, State, and Nation through excellence in computational science and engineering.

The HPC² comprises seven independent research centers/institutes with the common characteristics of a multi-disciplinary, team-oriented effort that is strategically involved in the application and advancement of computational science and engineering using high performance computing.

- Alliance for System Safety of UAS through Research Excellence (ASSURE)
- Center for Advanced Vehicular Systems (CAVS)
- Center for Cyber Innovation (CCI)
- Center for Computational Sciences (CCS)
- Geosystems Research Institute (GRI)
- Institute for Genomics, Biocomputing and Biotechnology (IGBB)
- Northern Gulf Institute (NGI)

== Additional links ==
- High Performance Computing Collaboratory (HPC^{2}) website
- Mississippi State University website
- Northern Gulf Institute (NGI)]
