= Catherine Engelbrecht =

American organisation founder

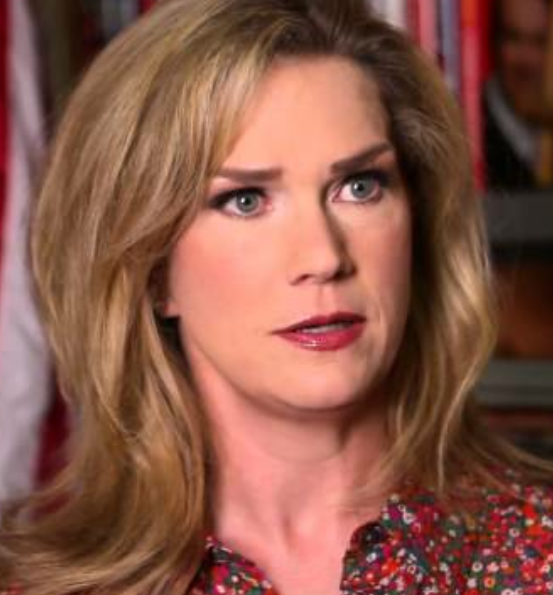
Engelbrecht in 2012

Catherine Renee Engelbrecht is the American co-founder of True the Vote and King Street Patriots, a nonprofit Tea Party organization which is active mostly in Texas. She is also the co-founder of "The Freedom Hospital" with Gregg Phillips, and the CFO of CoverMe Services Inc, one of his companies. The company was formerly known as AutoGov, Inc.

== Education ==
Engelbrecht has a bachelor's degree in marketing from the University of Houston.

== Career and politics ==
Engelbrecht was a small business owner and a parent–teacher association volunteer until Barack Obama won the 2008 United States presidential election. In 2008, after volunteering at the election, Engelbrecht began sharing her opinions about the US voting system, catching the attention of the Tea Party movement.

In 2009, Engelbrecht founded the King Street Patriots, naming the organization after the 1770 Boston Massacre. Several members of the King Street Patriots, including Engelbrecht, its president, were dissatisfied with the voting process in Harris County, Texas, during the 2008 United States Presidential election, especially the shortage of poll workers, which they believed "invited fraud and other problems at the polls." Later in 2009, Engelbrecht co-founded True the Vote.

Politico named Engelbrecht as "one of the 50 political figures to watch" in 2012. In 2018, Phillips renamed AutoGov, Inc. to CoverMe Services Inc. with himself as CEO and Catherine Engelbrecht as CFO. CoverMe claimed that “in the span of a five-minute interview, hospitals can provide patients with real-time eligibility and enrollment support, creating better outcomes for both the patient and provider.” It made $1.7 million charging services to University of Mississippi Medical Center for work through 2023

== Controversies ==
On June 5, 2022, Gregg Phillips had announced on Truth Social that he had begun a nonprofit under the name "The Freedom Project" and began soliciting donations to raise $25 million for a mobile hospital in Ukraine in response to the Russo-Ukrainian War. He claimed to have already raised half the amount needed due to an in-kind donation from manufacturer MED-1 Partners, but MED-1's CEO Tim Masud denied making a pledge or offer of any such donation. Additionally, "The Freedom Hospital", of which Engelbrecht was co-founder, posted a video on its YouTube account with a caption saying that its team was reporting from Ukraine. The Freedom Hospital had no role in producing the video, and Christopher Loverro, a Los Angeles-based actor and veteran, who made the video in front of a recently bombed Ukrainian preschool, said he never had any connection to The Freedom Hospital and had not given anyone permission to use his work. Loverro said he reported the video to YouTube and commented on the post, warning: "This is a scam. Do not donate to this organization." The hospitals in Ukraine never materialized, and Phillips abandoned the project earlier in April 2022, months before making the fundraising posts on TruthSocial, according to his attorney. True the Vote was listed as the fiscal sponsor on the website, which has since been deleted.

In October 2022, Engelbrecht, and True the Vote former board member Gregg Phillips, were jailed for contempt of court after refusing to name the person who allegedly gave them information about election logistics software company Konnech. Konnech was litigating for defamation damages after being accused of rigging the 2020 United States presidential election. Both were held in Joe Corley Detention Facility in Conroe, Texas. In February 2024, True the Vote told a Georgia judge that it has no evidence to support its claims of illegal ballot stuffing in Atlanta during the 2020 general election and a runoff two months later.

== Personal life ==
Engelbrecht is a mother of two children, a Christian by affiliation, and was aged 52 in 2022. She lives in Cat Springs, Texas.
