= Christopher Fettweis =

American political scientist and Professor of Political Science at Tulane University

Christopher J. Fettweis
- Citizenship: American
- Education: University of Maryland (PhD); University of Notre Dame (BA)
- Awards: Mortar Board Excellence in Teaching Award; Honor’s Professor of the Year
- Scientific career
- Fields: International relations
- Workplaces: Tulane University

Christopher J. Fettweis is an American political scientist and Professor of Political Science at Tulane University. He is known for his expertise on American foreign relations.

== Books ==
- The Pursuit of Dominance: 2000 Years of Superpower Grand Strategy, Oxford University Press, 2022
- Making Foreign Policy Decisions: A Presidential Briefing Book, Transactions Press, 2015
- The Pathologies of Power: Fear, Honor, Glory and Hubris in U.S. Foreign Policy, Cambridge University Press, 2013
- Dangerous Times? The International Politics of Great Power Peace, Georgetown University Press, 2010
- Losing Hurts Twice as Bad: The Four Stages to Moving Beyond Iraq, W.W. Norton, 2008
