= Cleta Mitchell =

American lawyer, politician and conservative activist (born 1950)

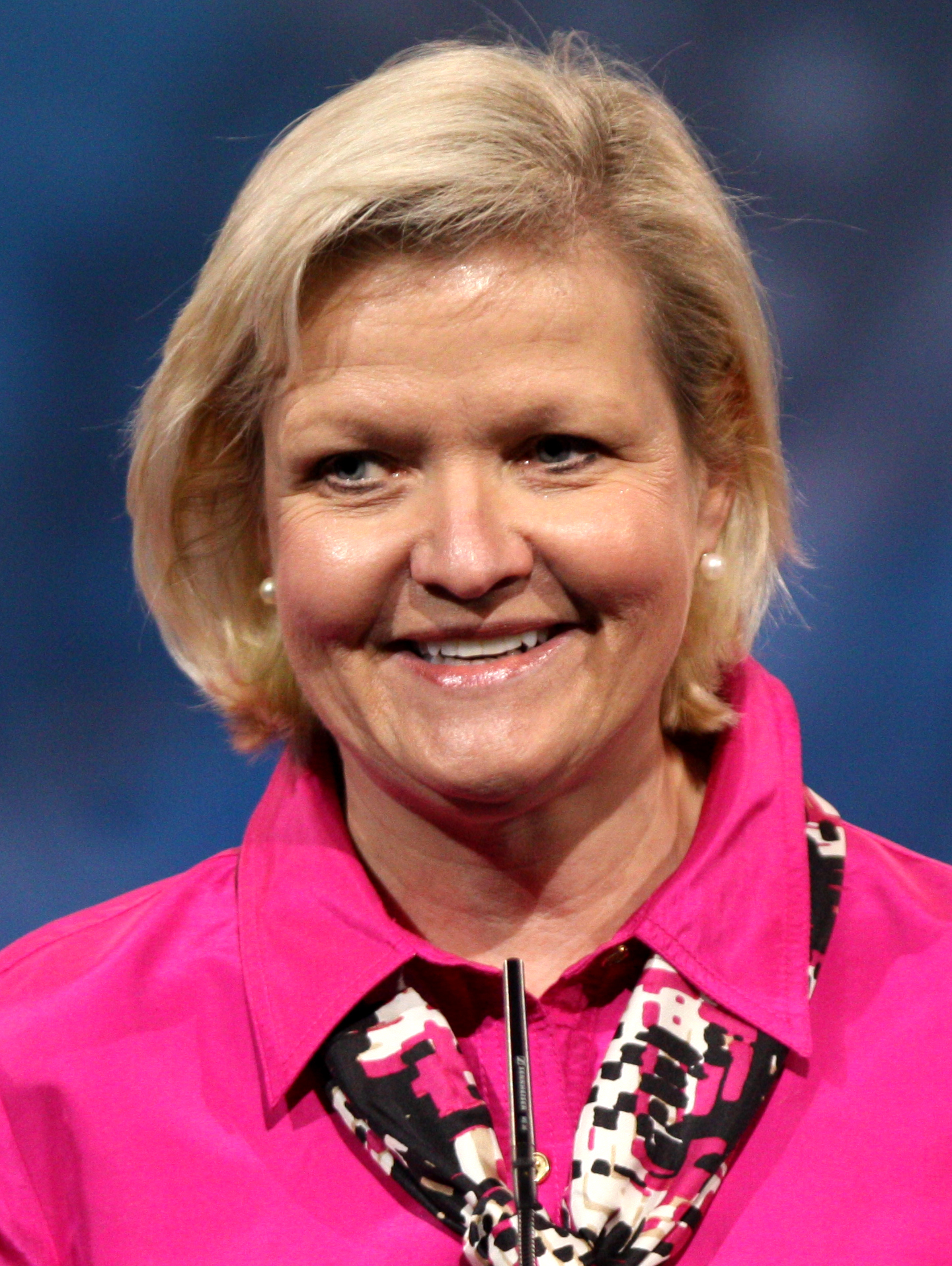

Member of the Oklahoma House of Representatives from the 44th district
- In office 1976–1984
- Preceded by: Mina Hibdon
- Succeeded by: Carolyn Thompson Taylor

Personal details
- Born: Cleta Deatherage; September 16, 1950 (age 76) Oklahoma City, Oklahoma, U.S.
- Party: Democratic (before 1996); Independent (1996); Republican (1996–present)
- Spouses: Duane Draper (m. 1973–1982); Dale Mitchell (m. 1984)
- Education: University of Oklahoma (BA, JD)

Cleta B. Deatherage Mitchell (née Deatherage; born September 16, 1950) is an American lawyer, former politician, and Republican elections activist. Elected in 1976, Mitchell served in the Oklahoma House of Representatives until 1984, representing District 44 as a member of the Democratic Party. In 1996, she registered as a Republican. Since then, she has worked as a Republican lawyer and activist focused on elections, asserting, without evidence, that Democrats win elections only by cheating.

After Democratic candidate Joe Biden won the 2020 presidential election, Mitchell aided Donald Trump in his efforts to overturn the election results and pressure election officials to "find" sufficient votes for him to win. After participating in a telephone call in which Trump pressured Georgia Secretary of State Brad Raffensperger to alter the election results in Georgia (which was won by Biden), Mitchell resigned as a partner at Foley & Lardner. In 2021, she set up an escrow fund to funnel money to companies conducting a pro-Trump "audit" into Arizona's 2020 election. Since then, she has pushed for election law changes in Georgia that would hinder quick reporting of election results and make it easier to delay certification of election results.

== Early life and education ==
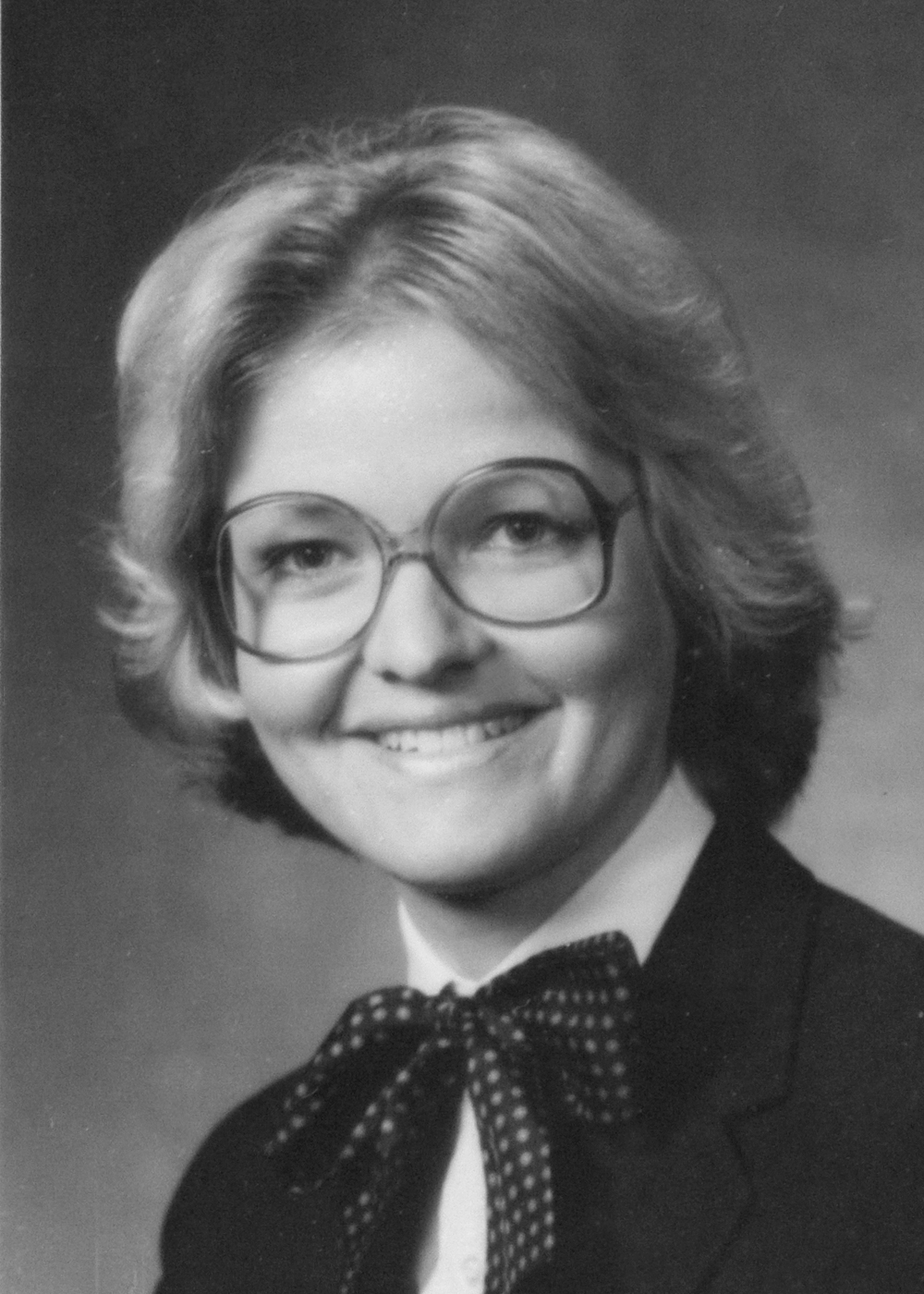
Cleta Mitchell

Cleta Mitchell was born as Cleta Deatherage on September 16, 1950, in Oklahoma City, Oklahoma. She attended Classen High School her junior and senior year. In 1971, Mitchell was one of the five original conveners of the Oklahoma Women's Political Caucus. She received a B.A. in 1973 and a J.D. in 1975, both from the University of Oklahoma.

As a student she was a proponent of the women's rights movement and campaigned for the passage of the Equal Rights Amendment and for legal recognition–then denied in Oklahoma–of a homemaker's contribution to the value of a married couple's estate. She considered US Senator Margaret Chase Smith of Maine her role model. She was also one of the first women to run for student president at the University of Oklahoma, but lost the election.

== Oklahoma House of Representatives ==
Mitchell served as a member of the Oklahoma House of Representatives from 1976 to 1984, as member of the Democratic Party. In her second term, Mitchell was the first woman to chair the Oklahoma House Appropriations and Budget Committee. During her tenure, she supported women's rights, the Equal Rights Amendment, and progressive education reform.

She also served on the executive committee of the National Conference of State Legislatures. She was a fellow at the Harvard Kennedy School's Institute of Politics in 1981. In 1984, she was listed in Time as one of the most promising Democratic women.

Mitchell returned to politics and ran unsuccessfully for Oklahoma lieutenant governor in 1986. Former Oklahoma Governor David Walters said her loss in the Democratic primary to Robert S. Kerr III "precipitated a real turn on her part."

== Legal work and conservative activism ==
In 1991 she moved to Washington, D.C., to become a pro-term limits activist; that year, she was named executive director of the Term Limits Legal Institute. She was co-counsel for the petitioners in the U.S. Supreme Court case U.S. Term Limits, Inc. v. Thornton, in which the Court held that the federal Constitution precluded state governments from imposing term limits for federal office.

In 1996, Mitchell switched her political affiliation from Democratic to independent, and then to Republican. At some point in the 1990s she rescinded her support for the Equal Rights Amendment and praised its failure to pass.

In 2001, she joined Foley & Lardner where she represented various conservative causes. She resigned in January 2021 due to legal concerns about her involvement in the call Trump made to attempt the reversal of the Georgia's certified votes in the 2020 United States presidential election.

Mitchell represented Donald Trump in 2011, defending him against accusations that he had violated federal election laws in an exploratory campaign for president.

Mitchell has been a leading critic of the IRS, accusing the agency of targeting Tea Party groups. She testified before Congress in 2014, asserting that "the commissioner of the IRS lied to Congress". She called for the IRS to be abolished. Investigations by Congress and federal agencies later concluded that there was no evidence that the IRS targeted conservative groups. She has also represented Tea Party Republican candidates Sharron Angle of Nevada and Alaska's Joe Miller.

In 2018, McClatchyDC reported that Mitchell, as a longtime lawyer for the NRA, had previously expressed concerns about the NRA's close ties to Russia and the possibility that Russia had been funneling cash through the NRA into Donald Trump's 2016 presidential campaign. Mitchell denied ever having expressed such concerns. Mitchell's name was included in a list of people that Democrats on the U.S. House Intelligence Committee sought to interview in connection with the committee's investigation into Russian interference in the 2016 election.

Mitchell was the trustee of EPA administrator Scott Pruitt's legal defense fund. As trustee of that fund, she sought donations to the fund by individuals who had interests before the EPA. In 2019, she represented Stephen Bannon's nonprofit, Citizens of the American Republic.

Mitchell was a staunch opponent of public health measures implemented at the state and local levels to halt the spread of COVID-19.

She has served as legal counsel for the National Republican Senatorial Committee, the National Republican Congressional Committee, and the National Rifle Association of America. She has represented Sen. Elizabeth Dole (R-NC), Sen. Jim Inhofe (R-OK), Sen. David Vitter (R-LA), Sen. Gordon Smith (R-OR), Sen. Jim DeMint (R-SC), Sen. Roy Blunt (R-MO), Sen. Marco Rubio (R-FL), Sen. Pat Toomey (R-PA), Sen. Kelly Ayotte (R-NH), and Rep. Tom Cole (R-OK).

She is on the boards of numerous conservative organizations, including the Bradley Foundation which has given $6.5 million to Project Veritas, the National Rifle Association (NRA) (where she has also been a lawyer), and the Republican National Lawyers Association, of which she is a former president. As a board member of the American Conservative Union (ACU), Mitchell played a major role in efforts to expel GOProud (a pro-gay rights Republican group) from the Conservative Political Action Conference (CPAC), a major annual right-wing convention organized by the ACU.

=== Susan Collins bribery allegations ===
When a bribery scheme orchestrated by a defense contractor was exposed in 2019, Mitchell is alleged to have participated in the cover-up. In an email released in civil litigation related to the scandal, Mitchell suggested that the shell company used to facilitate the scheme begin to make donations that would make it seem like a "legitimate" nonprofit.

=== Attempt to overturn the 2020 election ===
Mitchell, in part as a member of the Public Interest Legal Foundation and Council for National Policy, spent the 2020 presidential election and its aftermath campaigning against supposed voter fraud. She organized legal challenges against the mail-in ballots cast in larger numbers than in previous cycles, with one of her claims being that votes had been made in the names of deceased people. She worked closely with Ginni Thomas, wife of Supreme Court justice Clarence Thomas, and introduced President Donald Trump to John Eastman, writer of legal memos detailing ways in which Trump, having lost to former Vice President Joe Biden, could remain in power past Biden's inauguration.

On January 2, 2021, Mitchell participated in a telephone conversation between Trump and Georgia Secretary of State Brad Raffensperger. During the hour-long call, Raffensperger was pressured to investigate questions from right-wing media about the results of the presidential election, including in Georgia. Mitchell would later accuse Raffensperger of saying things "that are simply not correct" about the election.

On January 4, Foley & Lardner, the law firm where Mitchell was a partner, released a statement saying that it would not represent parties seeking to contest the results of the election; that it was "aware of, and concerned by" her participation in the call; and that it was "working to understand her involvement more thoroughly". Believing that "it was in the firm's best interests, as well as in her own personal best interests", Mitchell resigned the next day. She blamed her decision on a "massive pressure campaign" allegedly launched by leftist groups on social media.

=== Voting restrictions campaign ===
In 2021, Michell took a central role in coordinating Republican efforts to tighten voting laws. FreedomWorks put her in charge of a $10 million initiative to push for voting restriction and train conservatives in local elections.

Mitchell also set up an escrow fund to funnel money to companies conducting a pro-Trump "audit" into the 2020 presidential election in Maricopa County, Arizona.

=== Election Assistance Commission ===
From November 2021 until November 2023, Mitchell served on the Board of Advisors of the federal Election Assistance Commission. The Board meets biannually and has no rule-making authority but can make recommendations to the Commission. She was nominated by Republican-appointed members of the Commission and approved by a majority vote. The EAC certifies voting machines and advises local election officials on compliance with federal regulations.

=== Election Integrity Network ===
The Conservative Partnership Institute, a right-wing think tank formed by Jim DeMint, helped to create the Election Integrity Network project, an effort spearheaded by Cleta Mitchell beginning in 2021. Both Mitchell and former White House chief of staff Mark Meadows are senior members of the Conservative Partnership Institute, which received funding from Trump's Save America PAC.

According to The New York Times, Mitchell is preparing for future elections, and has support from other well-funded right-wing organizations as well, including the Republican National Committee. The Election Integrity Network has held seminars and trainings throughout the country, and is "recruiting election conspiracists into an organized cavalry of activists [who will be] monitoring elections ... She has tapped into a network of grass-root groups" that promote the "big lie" and believe Trump won the 2020 election. Speaking about these organizing efforts, during a June 2022 episode of Stephen Bannon's War Room podcast, Mitchell stated: "2020 — never again. That's our goal."

Some of the ambitions of this newly formed Election Integrity Network may be achieved based on tactics such as poll-monitoring, and filing public records requests, but there are concerns that the group will also focus on researching "local and state officials to determine whether each is a 'friend or foe' of the movement." Mitchell's Election Integrity Network trainings have included "aggressive methods" such as surveillance, and encouraging participants to verify voter rolls themselves. This may put extra pressure on local officials and be disruptive to the voting process, especially "when conducted by people convinced of falsehoods about fraud."

The Election Integrity Network has produced a social media posting guide to advise members, suggesting the use of Facebook, X, Truth Social, Gettr and Rumble.

=== Podcast and ERIC ===
Mitchell hosts a podcast called "Who's Counting", and is a major lobbyist against state participation in Electronic Registration Information Center, which allows states to compare voter rolls to prevent double-voting.

== Personal life ==
She married Duane Draper, a fellow Oklahoman from Norman, in 1973. In 1980 he took a teaching fellowship at Harvard's Kennedy School of Government, moving to Massachusetts. The couple divorced two years later in July 1982 on grounds of "incompatibility". Draper later came out as a gay man, becoming the director of AIDS programming at the Massachusetts Department of Public Health in 1988. He died of AIDS in 1991.

In 1984, Cleta Deatherage married Dale Mitchell, who was the son of 1940s and 1950s All-Star Cleveland Indians and Brooklyn Dodgers left-fielder (Loren) Dale Mitchell. They have a daughter. In 1986, the FBI began investigating Dale Mitchell for banking malpractice, and in 1992 he was convicted of five felony counts of conspiracy to defraud, misapplying bank funds and making false statements to banks. He was ordered to pay $3 million in restitution, given a suspended sentence of five years, and ordered to perform community service. Her husband's conviction on one count was reversed on appeal and the amount of restitution was reduced. As a consequence of findings of the prosecutors' investigation, he had agreed in 1988 to self-removal from banking. According to Cleta Mitchell, his conviction convinced her that "overreaching government regulation is one of the great scandals of our times".

== Selected publications ==
- Mitchell, Cleta Deatherage (1991). "Limiting Congressional Terms: A Return to Fundamental Democracy". Journal of Law & Politics. 7: 733–746.
- Mitchell, Cleta (May 1999). "The Rise of America's Two National Pastimes: Baseball and the Law". Michigan Law Review. 97 (6): 2042–2061. doi:10.2307/1290242. JSTOR 1290242.
- The Lobbying Compliance Handbook (2008, Columbia Books)
- Mitchell, Cleta (2012). "Donor Disclosure: Undermining the First Amendment" (PDF). Minnesota Law Review. 96: 1755, 1762.

== See also ==
- Ziklag (organization)
