= Peggy Reeves =

American politician (born 1952)

Member of the Connecticut House of Representatives from the 143rd district
- In office 2009 – January 5, 2011
- Preceded by: Toni Boucher
- Succeeded by: Gail Lavielle

Personal details
- Born: May 20, 1952 (age 74) Lowell, Massachusetts, U.S.
- Party: Democratic
- Education: Connecticut College (BA); Pace Law School (JD)

Peggy Reeves (born May 20, 1952) is an American politician who served in the Connecticut House of Representatives from 2009 to 2011, representing the 143rd district as a Democrat.

Reeves was born in Lowell, Massachusetts. She studied at Connecticut College and at Pace Law School, where she earned her Juris Doctor, and she has worked extensively as an election monitor in Connecticut.

== Political career ==
From 1994 to 2008, Reeves was the town of Wilton, Connecticut's registrar of voters.

In 2008, Reeves was elected to represent the 143rd district in the Connecticut House of Representatives, where she served one term. Reeves ran for reelection in 2010, but was defeated by Republican candidate Gail Lavielle.

In 2011, Reeves became Connecticut's state election director and served until 2019, when she announced her retirement. In a press release, Connecticut Secretary of State Denise Merrill, a member of the National Association of State Election Directors and the Electronic Registration Information Center, commented that "Reeves is nationally recognized as one of the best election administrators in the United States".

In 2023, John Gomes, a candidate for mayor of Bridgeport, Connecticut, filed a lawsuit seeking to overturn the results of the election in which he was defeated by Joe Ganim, claiming that video evidence showed election staff mishandling ballots. The court found in Gomes's favor, and Secretary of State Stephanie Thomas appointed Reeves interim election monitor to oversee a court-ordered second primary election, citing Reeves's "deep knowledge of Connecticut elections law and procedures".
