= Lavielle =

Lavielle is a French surname, meaning 'the old'. Notable individuals with it include:

- Bernard Lavielle (1912–1997), Basque French-language writer
- Daniel Lavielle (1880–?), French gymnast
- Gail Lavielle, American politician
- Georges Lavielle (1906–1982), French rugby player
- Henri Lavielle (1921–1980), French politician
- Joseph Lavielle (1873–1936), French gymnast
- Miguel Lavielle (born 2003), Mexican freestyle wrestler
- Nicolas Lavielle (1788–1874), French pro-monarchy politician
- Solange Lavielle, French chemist
