= Operation Eagle Eye (United States) =

1960s Republican Party voter suppression operation

Operation Eagle Eye was a 1964 Republican Party national voter suppression operation which used vote caging against minority voters. Through the employment of literacy tests, oral demands to interpret the United States Constitution and detailed questions about a potential voter's origins and how long the potential voter had been in the United States, Republican workers would challenge minority voters, especially those with broken English. William Rehnquist, later chief justice of the Supreme Court of the United States, is said to have been the head of a group of lawyers hoping to challenge voters in minority Democratic precincts.

== Background ==
Operation Eagle Eye was part of a history of voter suppression in the United States.

Beginning in the early 1950s and 60s, it became popular for politicians to appeal to Southern whites through racially charged campaign messages:

Many succeeding Republican candidates and almost all Republican presidents made racial appeals – some subtle, some otherwise – to southern whites still angry at federal abolition of the Jim Crow system. This became known as the ‘Southern Strategy’.

Democratic president Lyndon B. Johnson's overwhelming popularity in the polls at the time – just a year in after taking office in the aftermath of Kennedy’s assassination – and his relentless talk of civil rights and voting rights heightened Republican National Committee concerns and swung the door wide open for voter suppression strategies of all kinds. It was in this context that the infamous Operation Eagle Eye was born.

Many believe that a similar operation used by the Republican Party in the 1958 United States Senate election in Arizona was the precursor to Operation Eagle Eye and the blueprint for which it was designed.

== Operation Eagle Eye (1964) ==
The Republican National Committee announced its plan to conduct a nationwide ballot security program entitled "Operation Eagle Eye" in 1964. It was to be employed in the presidential election between Barry Goldwater and President Lyndon B. Johnson.

At the time, Operation Eagle Eye was virtually unknown but a highly organized and financed effort by the Republican party to suppress minority voting. The RNC insisted it was necessary to protect the integrity of the American ballot and against voter fraud. "OEE" became the nation's first large-scale anti-voter fraud campaign where the Republican National Committee recruited tens of thousands of volunteers to show up at polling places, mostly in inner-cities, to challenge voter eligibility. In particular, whether the voter was able to read since literacy was a requirement to vote. The recruited poll watchers used a variety of tactics, including asking voters to read a portion of the Constitution, cameras, two-way radios, and calls to Republican-friendly sheriffs. This attempt to thwart electoral fraud by challenging voters at the polls only served to intimidate minorities and swing elections in favor of Republicans.

Future Supreme Court Justice William Rehnquist was a prominent figure during the years of Operation Eagle Eye. He was a poll watcher with direct involvement in challenging voters at the polls as early as 1958 in Arizona. Years later during Rehnquist's Senate confirmation hearings to become Chief Justice, a US District Attorney in Phoenix at the time testified that he had seen Rehnquist challenging black and hispanic voters at precincts in South Phoenix. Rehnquist denied any such involvement. However, his association with OEE remained a stain on his reputation despite being confirmed as Chief Justice in 1986.

Another key figure in Operation Eagle Eye was Charles Barr, its National Director. He said at the time that he expected "1.25 million voters to be either successfully challenged or discouraged from going to the polls", however he denied targeting voters by ethnicity.

=== Methods ===
Voter caging was a method of purging voter lists by sending mail to addresses on the voter registration polls and counting the number of returned or undelivered pieces of mail. This becomes the basis for purging the voter list. This is unreliable because mail can be returned for any number of reasons. However, in 1964, Eagle Eye supporters challenged 1.8 million voters' eligibility with this tactic.

Eagle Eye supporters also sent misleading or deceptive mailers to the voter lists. Some examples of this voter intimidation were mailers indicating a voter who had committed a traffic violation, etc. would be arrested after voting, or anonymous calls to minority voters telling them they would be harassed at the polls. An example was encouraging minority voters to write-in Dr. Martin Luther King's name for president knowing this would nullify their votes.

Challenging voters at the polls could happen in a number of ways. They could be asked humiliating questions, demanded to show citizenship papers, or asked to show proof they could read. Voters were challenged if they appeared on the purged voters list.

Psychological deterrence was a significant aspect of the operation's efforts. The Republican strategy attempted to discourage illegitimate voters from committing fraud by simply creating the appearance that they were being watched. It was for this reason that RNC leaders also encouraged poll watchers to bring cameras.

== Aftermath and legacy ==
In 1964, the Republican, Barry Goldwater suffered a stunning defeat. And although President Johnson won the election by a wide margin, out of Operation Eagle Eye emerged a frightening concept:

"Some of the methods employed by Eagle Eye became part of the modus operandi of subsequent Republican campaigns. These include challenging of Democratic voters at polls without cause, humiliation of uneducated voters, efforts to slow down voting in Democratic precincts, special targeting of minority, low-income neighborhoods for challenges and developing an attitude among ballot security teams that encourages stereotyping low-income and minority voters as venal and stupid."

After Operation Eagle Eye, literacy tests were challenged by the state of Arizona and the federal government instituted a ban on the requirement.

The footprint for OEE has endured for decades and the effects are still felt to this day. At the time OEE was launched, immigration was not a prominent issue because Latinos in Arizona "knew their place". Now immigration has taken a larger role in politics and discourages minorities from voting in border states. Similar OEE tactics are still being employed against Latinos in fear of deportation.

As of February 2014, there were 31 states with laws requiring some form of identification at the polls, while others are still pending court challenges. Instead of mobilizing voters, the Republican South has led a new charge for restrictive voting laws in response to changing demographics, and ideological shifts among the party. In addition to Operation Eagle Eye style voter suppression, voter caging, intimidation and dissemination of false voting information, the new Republican party has also had to respond to recent allegations of gerrymandering.

== See also ==
- EagleAI, a post-2020 voter suppression operation
- Brooks Brothers riot
- Bush v. Gore
- January 6th United States Capitol attack
