= Ziklag (organization) =

American Christian dominionist organization

- USATransform
- Named after: Ziklag
- Formation: 2018; 8 years ago
- Founder: Ken Eldred
- Type: 501(c)(3) organization
- Tax ID no.: 82-4819179
- Headquarters: Southlake, Texas

Ziklag is a Christian dominionist organization named after the biblical city of Ziklag. Its membership is exclusively for individuals with a net worth over $25 million as well as faith-based interests. The organization's goal is to "take dominion over the Seven Mountains" of society.

== History ==
Silicon Valley entrepreneur Ken Eldred created Ziklag after the 2016 election of Donald Trump to the presidency. It was registered in 2018 as a 501(c)(3) organization named USATransform. Until December 2022 its CEO was Rebecca Hagelin; she was replaced by interim CEO Julie Nimmons.

Ziklag's revenue in 2022 was $12 million.

== Members ==
The organization's membership is exclusively for individuals with a net worth of over $25 million as well as faith-based interests. It appears to have over 125 members.

Lance Wallnau, a self-described Christian nationalist, is an advisor to and a force behind Ziklag. Wallnau is a prominent figure of the New Apostolic Reformation, of which he says he is an apostle.

== Activities ==
In 2021, Ziklag began working "to take down the education system as we know it today", aiming to embrace prayer and "a conservative, biblical worldview in science, humanities and the arts" in public schools, which it claims are "indoctrinating children with a secular worldview". Ziklag's educational project is headed by Peter Bohlinger.

In an internal newsletter, Ziklag claimed that it had played a "hugely significant role" in getting Amy Coney Barrett onto the Supreme Court in 2020. It believes in the Seven Mountain Mandate and its actions in 2024 are divided into three projects: to scrutinize the electoral process, promote voting at churches, and engage in the parental rights movement.

Ziklag has supported Cleta Mitchell and the Conservative Partnership Institute led by Mark Meadows, who work on what they call "election integrity projects", and planned to support Mitchell's EagleAI election software project in the 2024 presidential election. Turning Point USA leader Charlie Kirk spoke to a gathering of Ziklag members in late 2023 and encouraged them to donate more.

In 2024, ProPublica reported on Ziklag's efforts to support Donald Trump's reelection as president and interviewed multiple legal experts who said the efforts could violate the law regarding nonprofit organizations.

In October 2025, The Guardian reported that it had received leaked documents which revealed that in 2022 Ziklag emailed its members to ask them to donate money for the filming of pilot episodes of a right-wing Christian-leaning late night talk show hosted by Eric Metaxas that Ziklag claimed would be a more inclusive alternative to what Ziklag deemed the predominantly left-wing content of existing late-night talk shows. Four pilot episodes of the show, The Talk Show with Eric Metaxas, were produced, but no network picked up the show. In reviewing the four pilot episodes, The Guardian wrote that the show was modeled closely on existing late-night shows, but that Metaxas lacked comedic talent and that the show's interview segments were boring, lacking notable guests and failing to explore topical issues.
