= Election denial movement in the United States =

Conspiracy theory

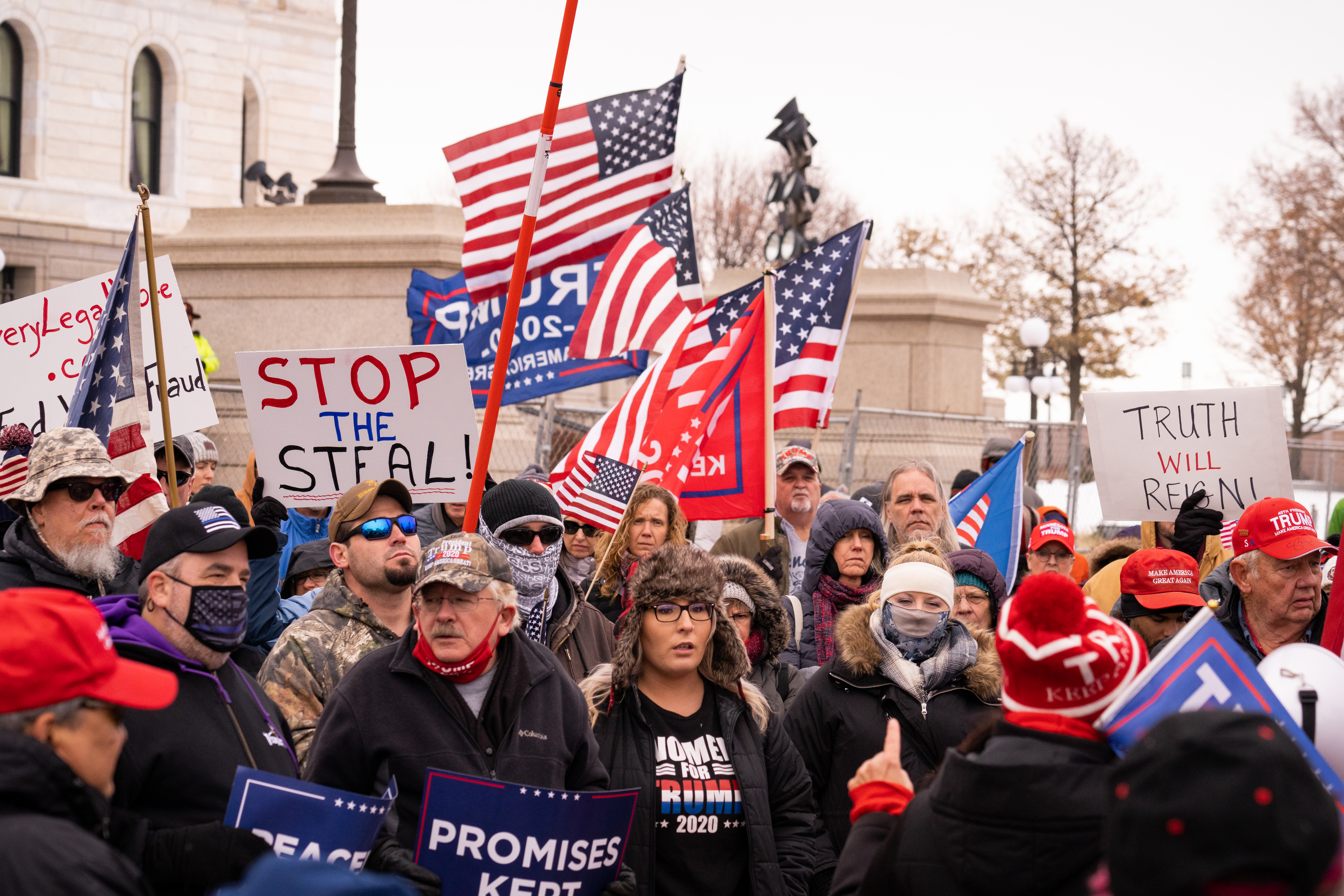
Supporters of Donald Trump at the Minnesota State Capitol in Saint Paul, Minnesota at a Stop the Steal rally on November 14, 2020

The election denial movement in the United States is a widespread false belief that elections in the United States are rigged and stolen through election fraud by the opposing political party. Adherents of the movement are referred to as election deniers. Election fraud conspiracy theories have spread online and through conservative conferences, community events, and door-to-door canvassing. Since the 2020 United States presidential election, many Republican politicians have sought elective office or taken legislative steps to address what they assert is weak election integrity leading to widespread fraudulent elections, though no evidence of systemic election fraud has come to light and many studies have found that it is extremely rare.

The movement came to prominence after Donald Trump was defeated in the 2020 United States presidential election. Trump had a history of questioning elections before he ran for office, notably the 2012 reelection of Barack Obama. He grew the movement among his supporters by making consistently false allegations of fraud during the 2016, and in particular the 2020 presidential election. With these false and unsubstantiated claims, Trump and his associates sought to overturn the 2020 election of Joe Biden; he and others have been indicted on federal and state charges involving election subversion. Trump's false allegations came to be known as his "big lie". Trump has since endorsed only Republican candidates who agree the 2020 election had been stolen from him, and did not commit to accepting the results of the 2024 presidential election, should he lose. By April 2024, Trump had embraced mail-in balloting and early voting, which he had for years vilified as corrupt and contributors to his 2020 election loss.

Democrats have also engaged in this movement, although to a smaller extent, with some contesting the 2018 Georgia gubernatorial election and the 2024 United States presidential election, alleging they were stolen by Republicans.

== Context ==
Going back decades, some influential Republicans who have expressed concerns around election security have been accused of using the fear of voter fraud as a pretext for voter suppression.

A notable quote that has been used as evidence of bad faith efforts to address voter fraud comes from Paul Weyrich, co-founder of the conservative Heritage Foundation, who said in a 1980 speech, "I don't want everybody to vote ... our leverage in the elections quite candidly goes up as the voting populace goes down." Aspects of election denialism have been noted to relate to the great replacement theory, which has been embraced by some Republican politicians to demonstrate their loyalty to Donald Trump. Trump has falsely claimed that Democrats are encouraging illegal immigration to allow noncitizens to vote and create a permanent Democratic majority.

=== Prevalence of voter fraud ===
Election experts have found that election fraud is vanishingly rare, not systemic, and not at levels that could have impacted a presidential election. In response to Donald Trump's 2016 claims of millions of fraudulent votes, the Brennan Center in 2017 evaluated voter fraud data and arrived at a voter impersonation fraud rate of 0.0003–0.0025%. That year, the center also analyzed the Heritage Foundation's database of voter fraud as tiny, reaching back to 1948, and one in which the vast majority of cases would still occur under the foundation's proposed election reforms.

=== Origins of the movement ===
Professor Andrew Smolar and Dr. Geoffrey Kabaservice believe this election denial movement began with the Tea Party after Obama's election, citing the Birtherism conspiracy theory as helping to dissolve trust in institutions and objective truth. Other dates that have been suggested for the start of this movement include 2012, 2016, and 2020.

Analyst Chris Sautter argues the movement is the latest stage of wrangling about election rules that began in the 1960s regarding severe restrictions to stop Blacks from voting in most of the South. The Voting Rights Act of 1965 outlawed discrimination and enabled the federal government to block new restrictions. During the Reagan presidency in the 1980s, the Republican National Committee (RNC) launched "ballot security" and "voter integrity" campaigns to reduce what it alleged to be voter fraud. They focused on minority communities with large Democratic majorities. They stationed off-duty police officers in conspicuous locations near polling places, distributed leaflets suggesting voters could be subjected to prosecution, and made unsupported challenges of registered voters. Federal courts concluded the techniques were designed to frighten minority voters in violation of the Voting Rights Act of 1965, and Republican Party officials were forced to sign a consent decree agreeing to stop. In 2013, the U.S. Supreme Court gutted the Voting Rights Act in its ruling on Shelby County v. Holder, which enabled Republican legislatures in at least 20 states to impose new obstacles for the 2018 elections.

== Disputed elections ==
=== President ===
==== 2012 ====
After Obama was declared the winner of the Electoral College while still trailing in the popular vote count early on election night 2012, Trump tweeted the election was a "total sham" because Obama "lost the popular vote by a lot and won the election" and "the electoral college is a disaster for a democracy", adding: "We can't let this happen. We should march on Washington and stop this travesty." The final election results showed Obama won the popular vote by nearly five million ballots. In the 2016 U.S. presidential election, Trump won the electoral college but lost the popular vote by nearly three million ballots. ABC News writer Terrence Smith described Trump's statements as the first example showing a broader playbook of election denial.

==== 2016 ====
During the 2016 Republican primaries, Trump alleged, without evidence, that his opponent Senator Ted Cruz stole the Iowa presidential caucuses after he had won them. During the 2016 presidential campaign, Trump asserted that the only way he could lose was if there was election fraud. Trump political advisor Roger Stone created a "Stop the Steal" organization in 2016 in the event Trump lost; it was revived after Trump's loss in 2020.

Trump claimed, without evidence, that millions of undocumented migrants voted illegally for Hillary Clinton in the 2016 presidential election, costing him the popular vote victory. As a result, Trump established an election integrity commission in May 2017, but the commission was disbanded several months later, with member Matthew Dunlap, the Maine secretary of state, writing to commission chair Mike Pence and vice chair Kris Kobach that, contrary to public statements by Trump and Kobach, the commission did not find "substantial" voter fraud. Dunlap alleged the true purpose of the commission was to create a pretext to pave the way for policy changes designed to undermine the right to vote. Critics said the commission's intent was to disenfranchise or deter legal voters. Kobach, then the Kansas secretary of state, had a history of making false or unsubstantiated allegations of voting fraud to advocate for voting restrictions. The commission did not find a single instance of a non-citizen voting.

Although Hillary Clinton conceded defeat in the 2016 election, she has referred to Trump as "an illegitimate president." In a 2019 speech in Los Angeles she spoke about the report on Russian interference in the 2016 election saying "You can run the best campaign, you can even become the nominee, and you can have the election stolen from you." In a 2020 interview with The Atlantic, she maintained that the election was "not on the level".

==== 2020 ====
Donald Trump complained of widespread voter fraud leading up to and following the 2020 U.S. presidential election, which was widely debunked. Having never conceded, Trump used this allegation of fraud as justification to try multiple times to subvert the election results and remain in office. Trump has demanded those seeking his endorsement to support his unfounded allegations of fraud. Many of those involved in the plots, including the riot on January 6, 2021, have been convicted, charged or are under investigation for crimes such as insurrection. Three witnesses close to Trump testified to the January 6 committee that they were aware Trump acknowledged he had lost within days after the election.

==== 2024 ====
===== Republicans =====
To sow election doubt, Trump escalated use of "rigged election" and "election interference" statements in advance of the 2024 election compared to the previous two elections – the statements described as part of a "heads I win; tails you cheated" rhetorical strategy.

Trump did not commit to accepting the results of the 2024 U.S. presidential election if he were to lose. Trump's niece Mary L. Trump and former Republican Representative Anthony Gonzalez, among others, predicted that he would once again deny the results of a loss and try to steal the election. According to NPR, the continuation of election denial tactics by Trump for the 2024 election was likely. In the lead up to the 2024 election, the Republican Party made false claims of massive "noncitizen voting" by immigrants in an attempt to delegitimize the election if Trump had lost. States found very few noncitizens on their voting rolls, and in the extremely rare instances of votes cast by noncitizens they are legal immigrants who are often mistaken that they have a right to vote. An election fraud database maintained by the conservative Heritage Foundation in 2024 indicated 85 instances of irregularities among noncitizens since 2002.

Many Republicans, notably Trump, long criticized "ballot harvesting" and the early voting it enables as rife with fraud and cheating, encouraging their voters to vote only at polling places on election day. The 2022 Dinesh D'Souza film 2000 Mules was centered on false allegations of illegal ballot harvesting by unnamed nonprofit organizations supposedly associated with the Democratic Party to commit election fraud. After disappointing Republican results in the 2020 and 2022 elections, some Trump-aligned organizations such as Turning Point USA recognized they needed to adopt similar ballot collection methods for the 2024 elections, which they named "ballot chasing". Turning Point said it would raise money to create "the largest and most impactful ballot chasing operation the movement has ever seen". Kari Lake, who refused to concede her loss in the 2022 Arizona gubernatorial race, said she would launch "the largest ballot chasing operation in our nation's history". Media Matters reported in March 2024 that Lara Trump, the new co-chair of the Republican National Committee, had said on a recent podcast that the RNC would launch a "legal ballot harvesting" effort. Lara Trump said on the same podcast that "I'm gonna say 75 million-plus Americans who still are like, what the hell happened in 2020? They didn't get any answers." She baselessly claimed that the odds of mail-in ballots giving Biden swing state victories was "one in one quadrillion to the fourth power". After insisting for several years that mail-in balloting is "totally corrupt" and contributed to his 2020 election loss, by April 2024 Donald Trump and the RNC were encouraging his supporters to adopt mail-in and early voting.

During the campaign, Trump often referred to "election integrity" to allude to his continuing lie that the 2020 election was rigged and stolen, as well as baseless predictions of future mass election fraud. As he did during the 2020 election cycle, without evidence Trump told supporters that Democrats might try to rig the 2024 election. Many Republicans believe a conspiracy theory claiming Democrats engage in systematic election fraud to steal elections, insisting election integrity is a major concern, though voting fraud is extremely rare. By 2022, Republican politicians, conservative cable news outlets and talk radio echoed a narrative of former Trump advisor Steve Bannon that "if Democrats don't cheat, they don't win". Appearing with Trump in April 2024, House Speaker Mike Johnson baselessly suggested "potentially hundreds of thousands of votes" might be cast by undocumented migrants; as president, Trump falsely asserted that millions of votes cast by undocumented migrants had deprived him of a popular vote victory in the 2016 election. Politico reported in June 2022 that the RNC sought to deploy an "army" of poll workers and attorneys in swing states who could refer what they deemed questionable ballots in Democratic voting precincts to a network of friendly district attorneys to challenge. In April 2024, RNC co-chair Lara Trump said the party had the ability to install poll workers who could handle ballots, rather than merely observe polling places. She also said that the 2018 expiration of the 1982 consent decree prohibiting the RNC from intimidation of minority voters "gives us a great ability" in the election. Trump's political operation said in April 2024 that it planned to deploy more than 100,000 attorneys and volunteers to polling places across battleground states, with an "election integrity hotline" for poll watchers and voters to report alleged voting irregularities. Trump told a rally audience in December 2023 that they needed to "guard the vote" in Democratic-run cities. He had complained that his 2020 campaign was not adequately prepared to challenge his loss in courts; some critics said his 2024 election integrity effort is actually intended to gather allegations to overwhelm the election resolution process should he challenge the 2024 election results. Marc Elias, a Democratic election lawyer who defeated every Trump court challenge after the 2020 election, remarked, "I think they are going to have a massive voter suppression operation and it is going to involve very, very large numbers of people and very, very large numbers of lawyers."

Days after the RNC voted Lara Trump and Michael Whatley to lead the organization, former OANN anchor Christina Bobb was named to head the RNC election integrity program which Lara Trump said occupied "an entire wing of the building". A staunch Trump advocate, Bobb was involved in attempts to overturn the 2020 U.S. presidential election, and promoted the false allegation that the election had been stolen from Trump by fraud. Bobb and seventeen other Republicans were each indicted on nine counts of fraud, forgery, and conspiracy in April 2024 for their alleged involvement in the Trump fake electors plot in Arizona. In April 2024, the RNC released a robocall script falsely alleging Democrats committed "massive fraud" in the 2020 election. The script added, "If Democrats have their way, your vote could be canceled out by someone who isn't even an American citizen."

By May 2024, election deniers in support of Trump had moved closer to the GOP mainstream. A report released on May 21, 2024, by States United Action found that "170 representatives and senators out of 535 lawmakers overall can be categorized as election deniers" and that two Senate candidates and 17 House candidates were on the ballot to join them. By 2024, the prevalence of election deniers was noted to have increased among top Republican officials in the RNC. In May, the Associated Press reported that under Lara Trump the RNC has "sought alliances with election deniers, conspiracy theorists and alt-right advocates the party had previously kept at arm's length". It also reported that Lara Trump supported a nationwide policy of not counting any ballots after Election Day, which was noted to be illegal. Trump and several Republicans have stated they will not accept the results of the 2024 election if they believe they are "unfair".

Following Trump's victory in the 2024 presidential election, an AP-NORC poll found that Republican confidence in the accuracy of elections jumped and that a majority were confident in the election results after Trump's win. Despite Trump's win, Reuters reported that the election denial movement had not gone away and had strengthened in certain areas of the country. It reported that several advocates continued to push for more restrictive voting laws ahead of the 2026 midterm elections, which critics alleged would cement Republican electoral advantages and lay the groundwork for discrediting future elections if preferred candidates lose. Several 2020 election deniers were also nominated for Trump administration roles, including Pam Bondi for U.S. Attorney General and Kash Patel for FBI Director.

===== Democrats =====
Following Trump's victory, some Harris supporters on X shared election denial conspiracy theories, claiming that millions of ballots were "left uncounted" and there being something "not right" with the election. Such posts falsely claiming Trump "stole" the election peaked at noon the day after at 94,000 posts per hour, with many receiving amplification and gaining over a million views each. According to Gordon Crovitz, the CEO of the media rating system NewsGuard, the phrase "Trump cheated" received 92,100 mentions on the platform from midnight until the Wednesday morning after. Besides the claims from Harris' supporters, some Trump supporters baselessly claimed the disparity between other years, the 2020 election, and a then-incomplete 2024 voting total indicated voter fraud in the 2020 election.

One major basis these false claims were founded upon was a claim that Biden won 20 million more votes in his prior election bid than Harris had in hers, at the time. American journalist and conspiracy theorist Wayne Madsen commented on Threads: "I'm beginning to believe our election was massively hacked just like happened a few weeks ago in the Republic of Georgia." At the time these fallacies were disseminated, votes were still being counted in many states. An estimate around the time using the Associated Press vote percentage total found that 16.2 million votes across twenty states and D.C. had yet to be counted. Statistical analysis of voting asserted that despite continued counting, the projections were already set and new ballots would not sway the outcomes of any of the states and D.C. The Cybersecurity and Infrastructure Security Agency director Jen Easterly refuted the false claims, and wrote in a statement that there was "no evidence of any malicious activity that had a material impact on the security or integrity of our election infrastructure". Another false claim alleges Musk used the satellite internet constellation Starlink to change the results of the election. Chief technology officer Chip Trowbridge of voting system manufacturer Clear Ballot dismissed the claim and added no machine used to scan voting ballots have any network connection whatsoever.

=== 2025–present ===
In the 21 months following his 2025 inauguration, Trump attacked US election integrity on more than 70% of the days.

Democratic congressional representative Jasmine Crockett accused Republicans of meddling to defeat her in the Democratic primary race against fellow Democrat James Talarico, even though the Republicans had preferred her as an opposition candidate.

On May 17, 2026, Acting U.S. Attorney General Todd Blanche told Maria Bartiromo on Fox News that "we have multiple investigations going on in Arizona, in Fulton County, Georgia" into 2020 election fraud. Blanche said that the wrongdoers are "very good at hiding misconduct" but also that the Justice Department had a "ton of evidence" against them. Bartiromo asked him if there will ever be a "definitive answer to whether or not the 2020 election was stolen." Blanche replied: "I'm not going to promise there's going to be a definitive answer...we are looking at it, and we're hoping to get one."

Although Trump initially expressed that he would accept the results of the 2026 United States elections, in which Democrats reclaimed both the United States Senate and the United States House of Representatives, within days following the elections, Trump wrote on his social media platform Truth Social: "Does anybody really believe that this 'Election' was honest. How could the Polls be so wrong??? Some early voting 'dumps' were so large that it was impossible to win, no matter how many people went to vote. It's all about the machines, which are far more important than the voter!" Trump's comments drew bipartisan criticism, including from Republican former U.S. Representative Marjorie Taylor Greene, senior The Blaze editor Daniel Horowitz, and conservative political commentator Megyn Kelly.

=== Statewide ===
==== 2018 ====
After the 2018 Georgia gubernatorial election, Democratic candidate Stacey Abrams lost to Republican candidate Brian Kemp – who, as Georgia Secretary of State, administered the election – and claimed that the election was "stolen" from her as well as claiming the election was "rigged" and "not a free or fair election", on the grounds that voter registrations had been improperly canceled and polling places in poor and minority neighborhoods had been improperly closed. The Washington Post reported that "more than 200 polling places" across Georgia were closed in the 2018 election, "primarily in poor and minority neighborhoods. Voters reported long lines, malfunctioning voting machines and other problems that delayed or thwarted voting in those areas." The Atlanta Journal-Constitution found that "precinct closures and longer distances likely prevented an estimated 54,000 to 85,000 voters from casting ballots" in the 2018 election; Kemp's margin of victory was 54,723 votes. According to Richard L. Hasen, professor of law and political science at the University of California at Irvine, "there is no question that Georgia in general and Brian Kemp in particular took steps to make it harder for people to register and vote, and that those people tended to skew Democratic." In 2022, Kemp again defeated Abrams, by a larger margin; Abrams conceded on election night.

==== 2022 ====
In addition to making false claims about the previous election a centerpiece of her 2022 Arizona gubernatorial campaign, Kari Lake refused to concede her loss, traveling the country into 2023 to promote her election fraud allegations amid speculation she was considering a run for Senate or being named as Trump's running mate in 2024. Her several lawsuits challenging her loss were thrown out, as has a lawsuit to stop using electronic machines. A July 2023 suit filed by Republican Maricopa County Recorder Stephen Richer, alleging Lake defamed him by claiming he had rigged the election against her, was in December 2023 cleared to proceed to trial. Lake was the Republican nominee in the 2024 United States Senate election in Arizona.

== Prevalence of election denialism ==
=== Role of conservative media ===
Conservative news outlets such as Fox News, Newsmax and OANN promoted false election fraud allegations during the weeks following the 2020 election, including conspiracy theories that voting machines had been rigged to favor Biden. Voting machine companies Dominion Voting Systems and Smartmatic filed defamation suits against those three cable networks, some of their employees and others. Fox News agreed to pay a $787.5 million settlement to Dominion in April 2023 after it was revealed that top on-air personalities and executives knew the allegations were false but continued to promote them anyway.

=== Elected officials ===
An October 2022 Washington Post analysis found that 51% of Republican nominees for House, Senate and key statewide offices in nearly every state that year denied or questioned the 2020 presidential election outcome. Secretaries of state oversee elections in states. In 2022, nearly one in three Republican candidates for those offices supported overturning the 2020 presidential election results. The America First Secretary of State Coalition, co-founded and led by Nevada Republican Jim Marchant, was created in 2021 to promote election deniers for secretary of state in the 2022 United States secretary of state elections. All but one of nearly twenty candidates the group endorsed in 2022 lost in the general election. According to analysis by the nonpartisan States United Action, election denialism cost Republican candidates from 2.3 to 3.7 percentage points of votes in the 2022 midterm elections. Trump made his election fraud claims a litmus test for Republican candidates and the heart of his platform. After Mike Johnson won the October 2023 Speaker of the United States House election, David A. Graham posited that only members of the election denial movement had a chance to win the speakership with only Republican votes.

=== Right-leaning voters ===
As of August 2023, a poll found that almost 70% of Republican voters and Republican-leaning independents continued to believe Joe Biden was not legitimately elected in 2020. In the exit poll for the 2022 U.S. House of Representatives elections, 35% of voters surveyed answered "No" when asked "Do you think Biden legitimately won in 2020?", and 93% of those who did not believe Biden was legitimately elected voted for Republican House candidates. Of the 61% of 2022 midterm voters who answered "Yes" to the same question, 74% voted for Democratic House candidates while 24% voted for Republican House candidates.

In the same poll, 80% of all voters answered "Very confident" or "Somewhat confident" when asked if they were "Confident your state's elections are fair/accurate?", 70% of voters who said they were "Very confident" voted for Democratic House candidates while 62% of "Somewhat confident" voters, 78% of "Not very confident" voters, and 85% of "Not at all confident" voters voted for Republican House candidates. Likewise, in the exit poll for the 2016 presidential election, 83% of all voters were "Confident" when asked the same question, 68% of "Very confident" voters voted for Hillary Clinton, while 61% of "Somewhat confident" voters and 65% of "Not confident" voters voted for Trump. In the exit poll for the 2020 presidential election, 86% of all voters were "Confident" in the vote count, with 52% and 56% of "Very confident" or "Somewhat confident" voters respectively voting for Biden respectively and 63% of "Not confident" voters voting for Trump.

However, in the exit poll for the 2024 presidential election, only 67% of voters were "Confident" in the vote count, 84% of "Very confident" voters voted for Kamala Harris, and 59% of "Somewhat confident" voters, 82% of "Not very confident" voters, and 80% of "Not at all confident" voters voted for Trump. In the exit poll for the 2018 U.S. House of Representatives elections, when asked "Which concerns you more? Some people will: cast illegitimate votes or be prevented from voting" (i.e. electoral fraud or voter suppression), 53% of voters said "Be prevented from voting" while 36% said "Cast illegitimate votes", and 78% of "Cast illegitimate votes" voters voted for Republican House candidates. After also asking questions about the Mueller special counsel investigation of Russian interference in the 2016 elections, the 2018 exit poll asked "Has the government done enough to protect this election?" (i.e. election security); 50% of voters saying "No", 38% saying "Yes", and 71% voters who believed the election administration was secure voted for Republican House candidates.

=== Marginal religious movements ===
Religious studies scholar Matthew D. Taylor pointed to a study that showed 82% of Republican prophecy believers thought the 2020 presidential election was stolen, compared to 40% of Republican non-prophecy believers, as evidence that the New Apostolic Reformation and similar groups led by self-described Prophets were especially influential in convincing their followers that the election was stolen.

== Analysis ==
Sarah Longwell, a Republican political strategist who strongly opposes Trumpism, wrote in April 2022 that she asked Trump voters in focus groups why they continue to believe the election was stolen from him. She perceived that for many it was a hard-to-explain tribal response to a message that is echoed throughout the participants' social and media environment. Analysis of polls by Charles Stewart, a Distinguished Professor of Political Science at MIT, shows that there are deep ideological roots involving belief in conspiracies, racial tensions and religion as well as partisanship. He argues:

Among Republicans, conspiracism has a potent effect on embracing election denialism, followed by racial resentment. Among independents, the strongest influences on denialism are Christian nationalism and racial resentment. And, although election denialism is rare among Democrats, what variation does exist is mostly explained by levels of racial resentment.

Some election experts and historians contend that, left unabated, election denial could further reduce concessions by losing candidates, disrupt the peaceful transfers of power and weaken or even dismantle American democracy. Lisa Bryant, a political science professor at California State University, Fresno, warned of the erosion of trust in the democratic process and the institutions it produces, which might lead to a breakdown in the rule of law if the government (and by extension the laws they create) are not viewed as legitimate. Michigan State University law professor Frank Ravitch writes that "Election fraud is a context where lies intersect with anti-democratic tendencies." The Brennan Center for Justice states that "election denial poses an ongoing and evolving threat."

=== Misinformation and disinformation ===
Misinformation about noncitizen voting was the main focus of election denialism ahead of the 2024 election. Richard Hasen wrote in January 2024 that, "Trump has been able to manufacture doubt out of absolutely nothing; fraud claims untethered to reality still captivate millions of people looking for an excuse as to why their adored candidate may have lost." Walter Olson of the Cato Institute said that Trump's agitations about election security and noncitizen voting are due to "his need to keep up the illusion that he somehow won". Matt Gertz of Media Matters argued in 2024 that the level of support for election denialism was due to a bifurcated media environment preventing factual information from reaching many voters. Sciences Po academic Jérôme Viala-Gaudefroy suggested that politicians and organisations promoted the election denial movement by tapping into the longstanding political paranoia of voters.

Russian operatives have promoted false claims of voter fraud in the United States with the goal of sowing doubt in election integrity, such as by questioning the reliability of mail-in voting. Russia's Internet Research Agency focused voter fraud memes at right-wing groups, with its most-shared Facebook post of the 2016 United States elections reading "Like if you think only US citizens should be allowed vote" while showing a photo of Latinos waiting in line.

=== Relationship to other election issues ===
==== Confidence in elections ====
False claims of fraud linked to the election denial movement have lowered overall levels of trust in elections. According to The New York Times, "baseless claims of electoral fraud have battered trust in democracy". Richard Hasen described Trump as having undermined public confidence before the 2024 election, and expressed concern that both Republicans and Democrats would distrust the election results if they lost.

==== Political violence and threats ====
The combination of false claims about electoral fraud and violent, warlike rhetoric has been noted to raise the likelihood of election workers receiving threats, as well as political violence such as the unprecedented January 6 attacks. Some election experts worried that Trump's voters would resort to violence again in 2024 if he lost the election. In September, Trump threatened to jail people "involved in unscrupulous behavior" in the 2024 election, prompting widespread condemnation from election officials that it could provoke violence, including against election workers.

A 2024 Brennan Center survey found 4 in 10 election workers had experienced threats, harassment or abuse. In some cases where poll workers were intimidated by poll watchers in 2020, they were given additional protections for subsequent elections, including the electronic screening of poll watchers and a greater distance from them, panic buttons, bulletproof glass and now get extensive training on de-escalation and active shooter scenarios. Election offices between September 2023 and 2024 received white powder in envelopes and one in Ohio had its window shot. The mailroom in Durham, North Carolina was retrofitted before the 2024 election with a separate exhaust to protect against hazardous substances sent in the mail. Election officials in Georgia, Maine, Michigan and Missouri have also been swatted at their homes with bogus 911 calls. Jena Griswold said in 2024 she had received more than 1,000 serious threats in the past year, on which she blamed the Trump's rhetoric. The Department of Homeland Security issued warnings between July and September about right-wing election deniers possibly trying to bomb ballot drop boxes and commit other acts of terrorism, citing baseless 'perceptions of voter fraud' as the primary motivation of concern that could trigger violence by a lone wolf.

==== Voter intimidation ====
While voter intimidation has been relatively rare, it has increased since 2020 with the false claims of fraud and concerted efforts to recruit poll watchers. In 2020, Donald Trump encouraged his supporters to go to the polls and "watch very carefully". CNBC cited voter intimidation as a bigger concern for analysts than voter fraud ahead of the 2020 elections. According to The Washington Post, voting rights advocates in 2024 expressed concern that the rhetoric about noncitizen voting could have a 'chilling effect' on Latino citizens and naturalized immigrants exercising their right to vote. In Arizona in 2022, there were instances of people surveilling drop boxes and taking photos of people's license plates. Some bills passed in Republican states have also increased the likelihood of voter intimidation and election interference at polling stations.

==== Voter suppression and turnout ====
Sponsors of bills passed by Republicans in state legislatures that would disproportionately impact the voting access of minorities, young people, and other Democratic-leaning constituencies often cite the false claim that Democrats had stolen the 2020 election through voter fraud. Democrats and voting rights advocates argue that the Republican rhetoric around illegal noncitizen voting is not a sincere effort to address voter fraud, but is designed to increase turnout of the Republican base (and suppress the turnout of Latino voters). Rick Hasen believes that fraud messaging is aimed at the Republican base, noting how the rhetoric in court is more circumspect due to court rules.

== Priorities and supporters of the movement ==
Following Trump's 2020 loss amid his false allegations of fraud, Republican lawmakers initiated a sweeping effort to make voting laws more restrictive in several states across the country and to take control of the administrative management of elections at the state and local level. Some planned to deploy an "army" of poll workers and lawyers to challenge votes in Democratic districts.

The Washington Post reported in June 2024 on indications that county-level Republicans in swing states might be preparing to challenge and delay their certifications of voting results in 2024. Such delays might cause a state to miss deadlines that ensure its electoral college votes are counted in Washington on January 6, 2025. In four state elections since 2020, county election officials withheld certifications, citing mistrust in voting machines or ballot errors, though they could not produce evidence of actual voting fraud; the certifications proceeded after state interventions, which included warnings of potential (and in Arizona, actual) criminal charges. Voting rights activists were concerned that the continuing false allegations of election fraud since 2020 might lead to social unrest if efforts to delay certifications at the local level were overruled by state officials or courts. The failure of a state to have its electoral college votes counted on January 6 could result in neither presidential candidate reaching the minimum 270 electoral votes, causing the election to be thrown to the House. In that scenario, the election outcome would be determined by a simple majority count of state legislature representations; Republicans controlled 28 of 50 legislatures in 2024.

=== Notable supporters of the election denial movement ===
Dennis Montgomery promoted widely debunked 'evidence' for both the birther conspiracy theory movement and the 2020 election denial movement (among other far-right conspiracies), was frequently widely cited by supporters of President Trump's efforts to overturn the election.

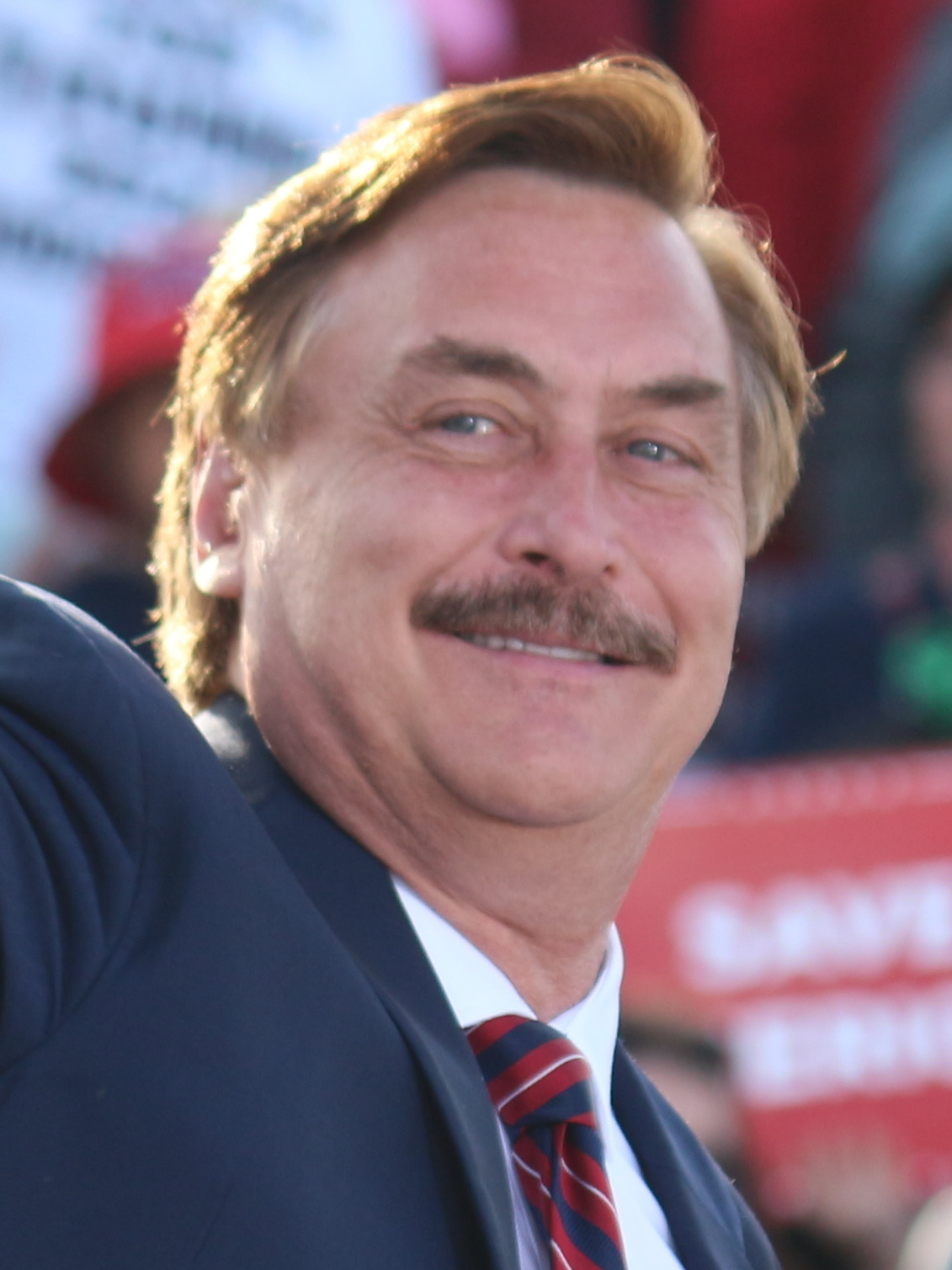
Lindell (pictured here in 2022) asserts the 2020 election was stolen through a complex global scheme to hack into voting machines.

By 2022, My Pillow founder Mike Lindell had become a prominent figure in the movement, spending millions of his money for conferences, activist networks, a media platform, legal actions and research. Through his My Pillow advertising placements, he became a major financial backer of an expanding network of right-wing podcasters and influencers. Lindell's legal firm said in an October 2023 court filing that Lindell was in arrears by millions of dollars in fees and that the firm could no longer afford to represent him, which Lindell confirmed.

The Conservative Partnership Institute (CPI) was founded in 2017 by former Republican senator and the Heritage Foundation president Jim DeMint. CPI employs Mark Meadows and Jeffrey Clark and has been described as the "nerve center" for the MAGA movement. CPI's funding increased from $1.7 million 2017 to $45 million in 2021. CPI includes the Election Integrity Network, led by Cleta Mitchell. Mitchell was a Trump advisor after the 2020 election who participated in the Trump–Raffensperger phone call during which Trump pressured the Georgia secretary of state to "find" ballots that would secure him a victory in the state. Trump and 18 others, including Meadows and Clark, were indicted in the Georgia election racketeering prosecution for allegedly running a "criminal racketeering enterprise." Mitchell was one of 39 individuals a special grand jury recommended for indictment on multiple charges, though prosecutor Fani Willis declined to charge her. By 2022, Mitchell said she was "taking the lessons we learned in 2020" as she held seminars around the country to recruit election deniers to monitor elections because "the only way [Democrats] win is to cheat."

In 2022, the Brennan Center for Justice at New York University Law School identified several individuals or groups that together were spending tens of millions to support election deniers in that year's midterm elections. These included the billionaire couple Richard and Elizabeth Uihlein; Trump's Save America PAC; and Home Depot co-founder Bernard Marcus. Former Overstock.com CEO Patrick Byrne said he spent $20 million to convince people that the 2020 election was stolen; he was also a major funder of the 2021 Maricopa County presidential ballot audit that sought but failed to find election fraud in the 2020 presidential election. Byrne has been the largest funder of The America Project, which pushes election denial narratives. That group was founded by former Trump national security advisor Michael Flynn in 2021, with an agenda that includes undermining trust in elections. Byrne, Flynn and others attended a December 2020 Oval Office meeting with Trump to discuss ways to overturn the president's election loss.

Oracle Corporation founder Larry Ellison joined a November 2020 conference call with Sean Hannity and Senator Lindsey Graham to discuss ways to challenge the legitimacy of the 2020 election. By October 2022, Ellison was donating millions of dollars to a SuperPAC to support four Senate candidates who had cast doubt on the 2020 election results. The 2022 Dinesh D'Souza film 2000 Mules film falsely alleges unnamed nonprofit organizations associated with the Democratic Party paid "mules" to illegally collect and deposit ballots into drop boxes in five swing states during the 2020 presidential election.

Some analysts and both Republican and Democratic politicians have suggested that election denial may include an element of grifting to solicit donations from unwitting supporters. With an email campaign, Trump raised about $250 million for what he told donors was an "official election defense fund" that did not actually exist. By September 2022, a federal grand jury was investigating whether Trump and his allies were soliciting donations on the basis of claims they knew were false, which might violate federal wire fraud laws. The Smith special counsel investigation was also examining the fundraising of former Trump attorney Sidney Powell by September 2023.

The Guardian, in collaboration with Documented, an investigative journalism project, reported that in February 2023 that the Heritage Foundation hosted a conference in Washington D.C. that included nine secretaries of state from Republican-controlled states to discuss "election integrity" issues. A lawyer at the foundation (who advocated against mail-in voting during the pandemic) said the policies discussed at the private event would help make "it easy to vote and hard to cheat" and disputed that implementing security measures like voter ID would suppress turnout.

Kevin Roberts, president of the Heritage Foundation, was asked in June 2024 if Heritage would accept the results of the 2024 presidential election regardless of its outcome. He replied, "Yes, if there isn't massive fraud like there was in 2020." When presented with data from the Heritage Foundation election fraud database indicating there were only 1,513 proven instances of voter fraud in the United States since 1982, Roberts responded that fraud is "very hard to document, and the Democrat party is very good at fraud". In October 2024, some people who had volunteered as fake electors in 2020 were reported to have been chosen as legitimate electors for Trump should he win the November 2024 elections in certain states. Seven states – Georgia, Pennsylvania, Arizona, Wisconsin, Nevada, New Mexico and Michigan – have 82 electoral votes. Among them are 14 people who volunteered as fake electors in 2020 and 16 additional deniers of the 2020 election.

== Election denialist groups ==
Group	Known state(s) of activity	Notes	Ref.
American Voters Alliance	Virginia	Headed by Jacqueline Timmer, who ran as a Republican for the Lynchburg, Virginia City Council in 2024 and won.	
Audit the Vote PA	Pennsylvania		
Bucks County Election Integrity Task Force	Pennsylvania		
Cause of America		Funded by Mike Lindell.	
Clean Elections USA (CEUSA)	Arizona	In 2022, voting rights activists in Arizona filed a lawsuit against CEUSA, alleging that its vigilantes have engaged in voter intimidation by appearing with military gear, weapons and drones at polling locations and ballot drop boxes, as well as by taking pictures of people attempting to use drop boxes with the threat of posting them online.	
Defend Florida	Florida	Met with the staff of Ron DeSantis, then-Florida Secretary of State Laurel Lee, and Republican state legislators. Connected to Michael Flynn, Patrick Byrne, Roger Stone and the Proud Boys. Supported a state bill for restricting mail-in ballots. Sent election officials thousands of names of voters for voter roll removal. Supported by the Republican Executive Committee of Brevard County, Florida. One of its activists used data from EagleAI.	
Election Crime Bureau		Organized and funded by Mike Lindell. Sent emails to local election officials around the United States, which included a survey asking them for sensitive personal data and information about their offices' cybersecurity infrastructure. The Center for Internet Security and election officials described these emails as "misleading". Used an app by Superfeed Technologies, a company tied to Tyler Bowyer, in which private citizens could file reports of suspected voter fraud.	
Election Integrity Force and Fund	Michigan		
Election Integrity Project California	California		
Electoral Education Foundation	North Carolina	Ran by the former chief of staff and campaign manager for Dan Forest. The vice president for research ran for city council in Waynesboro, Virginia.	
FEC United	Colorado, Michigan	Founded by Joe Oltmann. Connected to Mike Lindell and Kash Patel.	
Fight Voter Fraud	Connecticut		
Georgia Nerds	Georgia	One of its members had challenged at least 1,000 voters in Chatham County, Georgia between 2023 and 2024.	
The Liberty Center for God and Country	Texas	Run by Steven Hotze.	
Liberty Lions League	Kansas		
Lion of Judah	Michigan		
Look Ahead America	Missouri, Wisconsin, Arizona, Georgia, Texas, Florida, Nevada, Ohio, Pennsylvania, Virginia, Wisconsin	Founded by a former Trump campaign staffer in 2017. Has provided information leading to convictions in voter fraud court cases and is a prominent supporter of January 6 defendants.	
Maryland Election Integrity LLC	Maryland	Filed a lawsuit to halt the administration and certification of Maryland's 2024 primary and general elections.	
Maryland Voter Integrity Group	Maryland	Associated with the campaign of Dan Cox.	
Michigan Fair Elections	Michigan	Tied to the Election Integrity Network.	
Midwest Swamp Watch	Minnesota, South Dakota	Founded by a former mayor of St. Bonifacius, Minnesota who works as a Republican Party operative, had previously advised the campaign of Monae Johnson, and had also advised the South Dakota Canvassing Group. He was also connected to Kim Crockett and Mike Lindell. After attending a meeting by the group, Torrey Westrom questioned whether a state program to protect domestic violence victims could shield voter fraud. Supported removal of ballot drop boxes. Pressured county officials to publish cast vote records. Solicited volunteers for election judges. Accused by local voting rights activists of undermining democracy by supporting voting restrictions and overwhelming election staff with data requests.	
Minnesota Election Integrity Solutions	Minnesota	Founded by a Republican political consultant. Recruited about 8,500 Minnesota residents to sign up to be election judges. Worked with the Olmsted County Election Integrity group. Posted private voter data online in April 2025, with the Minnesota Secretary of State Office demanding that the group remove it.	
New York Citizens Audit	New York	Shares a founder with United Sovereign Americans. Received a cease-and-desist letter from the New York Attorney General's office, alleging voter intimidation and impersonation of government officials.	
North Brunswick Republican Club	North Carolina	Accused by both the local Democratic and Republican parties of harassing voters while canvassing, and linked to the North Carolina Audit Force.	
North Carolina Audit Force (NC Audit Force)	North Carolina	Questioned voters in door-to-door canvassing. Linked to the North Brunswick Republican Club. Organized a training for the Surry County, North Carolina Republican Party. Accused by a local election officer of attempting to access voting equipment. The leader of the group had formerly led NCEIT, and had spread voter fraud conspiracy theories, which the North Carolina State Board of Elections has unanimously deemed as baseless.	
North Carolina Election Integrity Team (NCEIT)	North Carolina	Run by the Republican Party chair for Lee County, North Carolina. State affiliate of the EIN. Worked with Hans von Spakovsky and J. Christian Adams. Advised by an RNC attorney. The leader also ran a PAC that supported Trump and other Republican political candidates. Organized a state-wide reporting system of alleged incidents which they planned to use for future protests, investigations and policy advocacy. Claimed to have trained over 1,200 poll observers by the fall of 2022, sparking concerns of overwhelming the electoral system. Sent mass records requests to local boards of elections, which election officials have compared to denial-of-service attacks. Opposed state election board rules against voter intimidation by poll workers and election observers. Discussed using voter caging and door-to-door voter canvassing in attempts to find voters that they believed were incorrectly registered. Posted signs in Spanish that warned non-citizens that they were ineligible to vote, an action that has been criticized as voter intimidation. One participant suggested that non-English speakers probably do not have the right to vote, and another made signs at polling sites warning against non-citizen voting in different languages, including "African", that were self-described as "psyop". Includes multiple county election board members, county Republican Party officials, and Dale Folwell as participants. Claimed credit for passage of a 2023 election policy bill in the North Carolina state legislature. Worked with Republican state senators to target ERIC. The founder stated that the group should challenge voters with "Hispanic-sounding" last names.	
Ohio Election Integrity Network	Ohio	Uses material from the national EIN. The election board for Licking County, Ohio gave permission for its staff to work with the group. Accused by voting rights activists of being "an unauthorized private group" that took over the state of Ohio's job of maintaining voter rolls after the state left ERIC.	
Ohio Voter Integrity Project	Ohio	Affiliated with True the Vote. In 2012, challenged 688 registered voters in Hamilton County, Ohio and Franklin County, Ohio. The vast majority of these challenges were discarded.	
Olmsted County Election Integrity	Minnesota	A group of residents of Olmsted County, Minnesota, created as an subgroup of the Republican Party of Olmsted County. Alleged that there were more voters than eligible voters during the 2020 election, a claim that was debunked by the county administrator. Requested access to voter registration postcards that were returned as undelivered to the county. Challenged 3,703 voters a few weeks before the 2022 elections. Hosted election judge training sessions that appeared to be official, alongside an RNC staffer. Asked election volunteers to take photographs of documents and equipment, as well as to rename their smartphones to impersonate the Wi-Fi hotspot networks of their polling places. The leader of the group had been hired as an election judge for the 2022 election, but was removed. Two election judges who were part of the group and had worked during the 2022 election primaries were investigated by the Rochester, Minnesota Police Department and were also removed, but were not charged. Participated in the review of 2022 general election results by the county canvassing board.	
Only Citizens Vote Coalition		Organized by Cleta Mitchell and includes groups that overlap with Project 2025. One of the then-leaders of the Michigan chapter (who had later worked as an elector to cast an electoral vote for Trump in December 2024) had proposed posting signs in "ethnic" neighborhoods that cautioned people against voting if they are not eligible, as well as searching voter rolls for "ethnic names". Between the 2020 and 2024 elections, over $590 million from mostly anonymous donors went to groups in the coalition.	
Opportunity Solutions Project	Kansas, South Dakota	Lobbying arm of the Foundation for Government Accountability, described as a "dark money" group. Lobbied for state-level bills to restrict election administration, such as on absentee ballots and ballot drop boxes.	
PA Fair Elections	Pennsylvania	Tied to Cleta Mitchell, Rosemary Jenks and John Eastman. State chapter of EIN. Challenged thousands of residents' right to vote. In August 2025, Heather Honey, a leader of the group, was appointed to a senior leader at the DHS Office of Strategy, Policy, and Plans, being responsible for election infrastructure of the United States.	
Pigpen Project	Nevada	The Pigpen Project is run by former Nevada GOP executive directors and endorsed by Paul Nehlen. The group is part of the Citizens Outreach Foundation, which attempted to purge 11,000 people from Washoe County, Nevada voter rolls in 2024, a move that the ACLU said violated state and federal law due to being requested within 90 days of the upcoming election.	
The People's Audit	Florida, Texas, North Carolina, Georgia	Documented reported that the group, founded by Kris Jurski, a frequent speaker on fringe election denial podcasts, is driven by conspiracy theories about "undeliverable" voter registration addresses where ballots are then retrieved by someone else.	
Secure MI Vote	Michigan	Organization formed by Republican voters and backed by Republicans that created a petition that forbids election officials from mass mailing absentee ballot applications and tightens voter ID requirements, among other measures. Received donations from the Michigan Republican Party in 2021, and the group in turn used its own money to solicit funding for the state party, leading to an accusation of violating state campaign finance law. Received $150,000 from Save America, Donald Trump's PAC, and $100,000 from the America Project, co-founded by Patrick Byrne. An investigation by the Michigan Daily found multiple allegations of deceptive practices by the group when collecting petitions. The petition was withdrawn after the passage of the 2022 Michigan Proposal 2.	
Soles to the Rolls	Michigan		
South Dakota Canvassing Group	South Dakota	Formed after Mike Lindell's 2021 symposium. Spread unproven claims of election fraud in the state. The South Dakota Freedom Caucus, a group of Republican lawmakers in the South Dakota state legislature, intended to help the group gain access to voter records. Claims by the group that at least two voters in the voter rolls were dead were contradicted by a local commissioner. Includes an elections coordinator for Minnehaha County, South Dakota. Associated with an auditor for the same county. Advocated for hand counting ballots - without any electronic voting machines - for the 2024 election, which a local lawyer warned would violate the Help America Vote Act. Their petitions were rejected by the South Dakota Board of Elections. The Minnehaha County poll board rejected an attempt by the group to challenge absentee ballots as the 2024 primary election was occurring. The group then appealed to the South Dakota Supreme Court and presented what they claimed to be evidence of election fraud to a county sheriff. Their request was denied. A person tied to the group unsuccessfully attempted to challenge about 200 voters on Election Day 2024.	
Strong Communities Foundation of Arizona	Arizona	A.k.a. EZAZ, represented by America First Legal, and whose leader had ties to Kari Lake and an anti-immigrant hate group.	
United Sovereign Americans	California	Represented by Bruce Castor.	
U.S. Election Integrity Plan (USEIP)	Colorado	Involved in a voting data breach in Colorado. The group's members were hired by Mike Lindell.	
Virginia Fair Elections	Virginia	Managed by the Virginia Institute for Public Policy. Received funding from the Bradley Foundation. Cleta Mitchell is on the board. Wrote the "Virginia Model", which describes the tactics of conservative activists during the 2021 Virginia elections and has since formed the basis for the EIN.	
Virginians for America First	Virginia	Tied to Cleta Mitchell. Funded by Patrick Byrne. Consulted by a company founded by a George Santos staffer.	
Voter GA	Georgia	Funded by the America Project.	
Voter Integrity Project	North Carolina	In 2012, challenged 500 registered voters, claiming they were non-citizens. The vast majority of these challenges were discarded. By 2014, lobbied the state legislature of North Carolina to use Crosscheck. In the lead-up to the 2016 election, had challenged the voter registration of about 4,500 voters, leading to allegations by the NAACP of disproportionately impacting African-Americans. The co-founder of the group was associated with McCrae Dowless, is the COO of the North Carolina Election Integrity Team (NCEIT) as of 2022, and has been involved in the legal disputes surrounding the 2024 North Carolina Supreme Court election.	
Wisconsin Center for Election Justice	Wisconsin	The Wisconsin Center for Election Justice also used change of address data from the USPS to find perceived ineligible voters for purging. This approach was deemed problematic by election experts due to the data's lack of coverage. Fond du Lac County District Attorney Eric Toney used their information to charge five people for registering to vote with a UPS store address. The leader of the group was previously convicted of mail fraud and bank fraud, and was investigated by the Wisconsin Capitol Police for stalking behavior towards officials at the Wisconsin Election Commission.	
Wisconsin's North of 29	Wisconsin	Connected to Mike Lindell. The founder's husband ran for Wisconsin State Assembly in 2024.	
Wisconsin Voters Alliance	Wisconsin	In 2022, Wisconsin Voters Alliance, which spread conspiracy theories about the 2020 election and attempted to overturn the results, filed lawsuits in 13 counties in Wisconsin to get access to guardianship records in an attempt to remove people from voting rolls that they perceived to be ineligible.	
