= Yorke Allen Jr. =

American politician (1915–1989)

Member of the Connecticut House of Representatives from the 143rd district
- In office 1979–1983
- Preceded by: John Grennell Matthews
- Succeeded by: Leslie Young

Personal details
- Born: April 28, 1915
- Died: April 6, 1989 (aged 73) Norwalk, Connecticut, U.S.
- Party: Republican
- Spouse: Elizabeth Sizer (m. 1946)
- Education: Princeton University (1936)
- Occupation: Investment banker

Military service
- Branch/service: US Army
- Battles/wars: World War II

Yorke Allen Jr. (April 28, 1915 – April 6, 1989) was a member of the Connecticut House of Representatives from the 143rd district from 1979 to 1983. He previously served on the New Canaan Town Council from 1970 to 1978. He was an associate of Rockefeller Brothers Fund.

He graduated from the Princeton University in 1936. He was President of the Board of Trustees of Lingnan University of Canton, China.

He died on April 6, 1989 at Norwalk Hospital in Norwalk, Connecticut.
