= Mina Hibdon =

American politician (1926–2010)

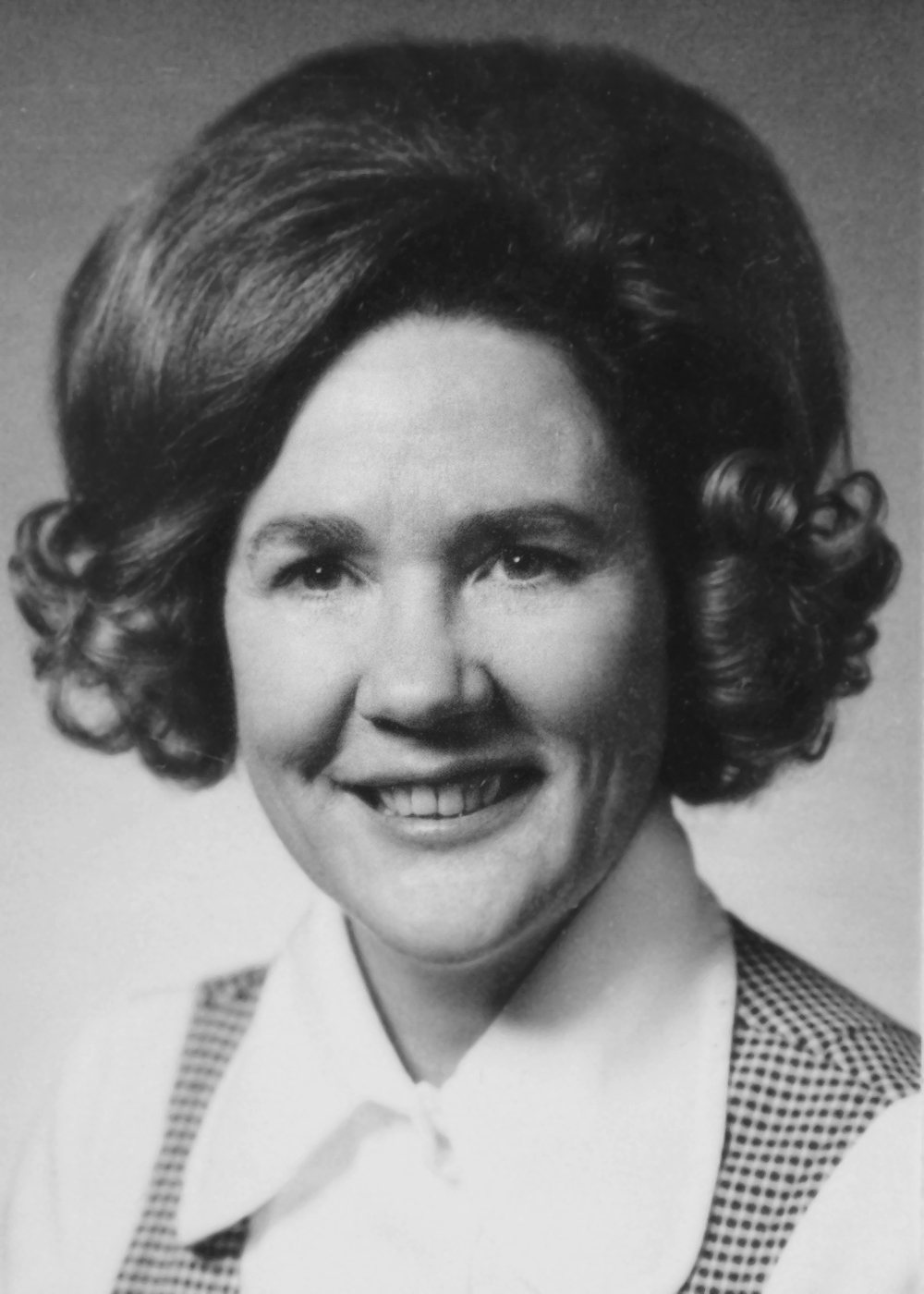

Member of the Oklahoma House of Representatives from the 44th district
- In office 1973–1976
- Preceded by: Byron Cate
- Succeeded by: Cleta Deatherage

Personal details
- Born: Mina Mae Gilreath; June 18, 1926 McAlester, Oklahoma, U.S.
- Died: May 21, 2010 (aged 83) Norman, Oklahoma, U.S.
- Party: Republican
- Spouse: James Hibdon
- Profession: Humanitarian

Mina Hibdon (June 18, 1926 – May 21, 2010) was the first woman elected to the Oklahoma House of Representatives from District 44, as well as the district's first Republican representative. Elected at the age of 47 in a special election in 1973, Hibdon served until 1976. A longtime humanitarian and active community volunteer, Hibdon volunteered for the Salvation Army for many years. Along with her husband James, Mina Hibdon died on May 21, 2010, in Norman, Oklahoma.

== Pre-political life ==
Hibdon was born on a farm in southeastern Oklahoma in McAlester to Joseph Gilreath and Cora Belle Bryant, the youngest of their eight children. Her grandparents Samuel Bryant, a medical physician, and Mary Ann, a nurse, both participated in her birth.

Hibdon graduated from McAlester High School. During her senior year, she wrote biographies on each senior for the McAlester News Capital.

During WWII, Hibdon served as an overseas operator for Southwestern Bell Telephone Company. She married her high school sweetheart, James Hibdon, in 1944. The couple moved to Norman, OK where James attended the University of Oklahoma. During this time, Hibdon became very active in her community with humanitarian efforts. She was a long-time member of the First Baptist Church, where she taught and served on many committees. She was one of the charter members of Bethel Baptist Church. Hibdon was appointed to and served on the Norman Planning Commission. In 1969, she was one of the founders of Norman Assistance League, Friends of the Norman Library, Salvation Army Bell Ringers, Norman Regional and Hospital Auxiliary. Hibdon also volunteered with Hospice of Norman and with foster children programs.

== Oklahoma House of Representatives ==
Hibdon was prompted to run for office upon the discovery of her local Senator's death. The local Republican banker in Norman suggested Hibdon's name as a possible candidate for his vacant Senate seat and organized a committee for her campaign. A member from the Oklahoma House of Representatives in that district decided to move over to the Senate seat, leaving the vacant seat in the House for which Hibdon campaigned. Hibdon was the first Republican as well as the first female to win a seat in District 44.

Hibdon worked to pass and reform the Equal Rights Amendment, a position that was not too popular in the conservative party. During her time in office, Hibdon proposed a bill to eliminate reference to gender in legislation. Before this bill, the male pronoun was widely and universally used.

=== Committees ===
- Appropriations and Budget
- Mental Health and Retardation
- Higher Education
- Municipal Government

== Life after the legislature ==
Hibdon was also a licensed pilot and had a rating of 1st Lt. in the Oklahoma Civil Air Patrol. On May 21, 2010, Mina died along with her husband, James Hibdon, in their Norman home.
