= EagleAI NETwork =

Conservative electoral roll software

EagleAI NETwork (pronounced "Eagle Eye") is an electoral roll management system that conservative activists use to file mass challenges to voter registration in the United States. It is considered an alternative to the bipartisan, non-profit Electronic Registration Information Center (ERIC) which is run by professional election administrators. Critics describe EagleAI as a way for private citizens to challenge voter registrations using unreliable data that highlights issues that professional election workers would know to dismiss, disrupting the overall process instead of improving it. NBC News describes the tool as "voter fraud vigilantism". Cleta Mitchell, former legal advisor to Donald Trump and founder of the Election Integrity Network, is associated with the nationwide attempt to rollout EagleAI as a replacement for ERIC. Unlike ERIC, EagleAI does not actually use artificial intelligence, as the AI in its name is intended to be pronounced as "eye".

== Background ==
In January 2022, The Gateway Pundit, a far-right fake news website responsible for promoting Barack Obama citizenship conspiracy theories, Parkland high school shooting conspiracy theories, and COVID-19 misinformation, began spreading election conspiracy theories claiming that the non-profit Electronic Registration Information Center (ERIC) was inaccurate and favored registered Democrats. ERIC is a bipartisan collaboration between Republicans and Democrats to maintain the accuracy of voter registration. In response to these conspiracy theories, nine states run by Republicans withdrew from ERIC. President Donald Trump later joined in on the attack on ERIC, calling it, according to Politico, a "liberal plot to control the county’s voter rolls".

Maine Secretary of State Shenna Bellows later described the right-wing attack on ERIC as a "disinformation" campaign. An analysis by NPR news in 2023 concluded that the Gateway Pundit was the instigator for the entire ERIC controversy. Michael Waldman of the non-partisan Brennan Center for Justice at NYU School of Law notes that after the Gateway Pundit spread this rumor about ERIC and GOP-led states began withdrawing from participation, conservative activist Cleta Mitchell began promoting the use of EagleAI in place of the ERIC system. Mitchell is notable for trying to help Trump overturn the 2020 election results.

== Creation ==
In response to concerns about the 2020 election, retired physician John W. "Rick" Richards, and his son John Richards created EagleAI (pronounced "Eagle Eye") in 2022 in Augusta, Georgia. USA Today reported that Richards said he was motivated to create the program when "he downloaded the Georgia secretary of state’s voter rolls and allegedly found people who should not have voted". When questioned about this alleged voter fraud, Richards was unable to provide evidence to support it and said "he no longer has the records". Richards says he named the program after the Eagle Scouts, a prestigious rank in the Boy Scouts of America. When asked about the resemblance to Operation Eagle Eye, a voter suppression campaign run by the Republican National Committee in the 1960s to help Barry Goldwater in the 1964 United States presidential election, Richards denied any connection.

== Description ==
Richards states that EagleAI is a non-partisan tool used to review voter lists. Unlike ERIC, which relies on accurate and reliable government-provided data, EagleAI uses public data and connects with Republican groups like the Voter Reference Foundation (VoteRef) which reveals voter information. In promotional literature, EagleAI previously claimed to use AI and "multitiered algorithms" to run its program, but Richards later admitted that there is no AI involved. EagleAI flags voter registrations for what it calls irregularities, which then delivers the alerts to GOP activists who submit the registration challenges to local voting officials on an election board. The Associated Press reported that the database of "suspicious voters" is created by "conservative activists".

== Election Integrity Network ==
Senior legal fellow Cleta Mitchell of the Conservative Partnership Institute (CPI), a former legal advisor to Donald Trump, was the founder of the Election Integrity Network. Compass Legal Group, the in-house legal compliance firm for CPI, and one in which Mitchell is a "beneficial owner" of, helped filed paperwork for Valid Vote, a non-profit arm of EagleAI. According to The Atlanta-Journal Constitution, Richards, EagleAI's CEO, "frequently speaks during Zoom calls hosted by Cleta Mitchell". Mitchell worked with the North Carolina Election Integrity Team (NCEIT) in March 2023 to host a demonstration of EagleAI. According to NBC News, Jim Womack of NCEIT said "Mitchell was working with Richards directly on the program's national rollout plan." In 2024, The Guardian independently confirmed Mitchell's direct relationship with EagleAI when it was able to review training videos. They reported that EagleAI software is designed for members of the Election Integrity Network (EIN), and that the Zoom calls featuring Mitchell were part of training videos that taught the group how to use the software system.

== Criticism ==
Critics have described these efforts as having the effect of voter intimidation, removing legitimate voters and creating gridlock to prevent elections from running smoothly. Experts are concerned that the use of EagleAI may intimidate voters or require them to jump through hoops to maintain their voting rights.

== Impact ==
In 2024, Cobb County, Georgia, rejected attempts by conservative activists to remove 2,472 voters from the rolls based on data generated by EagleAI.
