= Dominique Johnson (politician) =

American politician

Member of the Connecticut House of Representatives from the 143rd district
- Incumbent
- Assumed office January 4, 2023
- Preceded by: Stephanie Thomas

Personal details
- Party: Democratic
- Education: Bryn Mawr College (B.A.); Temple University (Ph.D.)
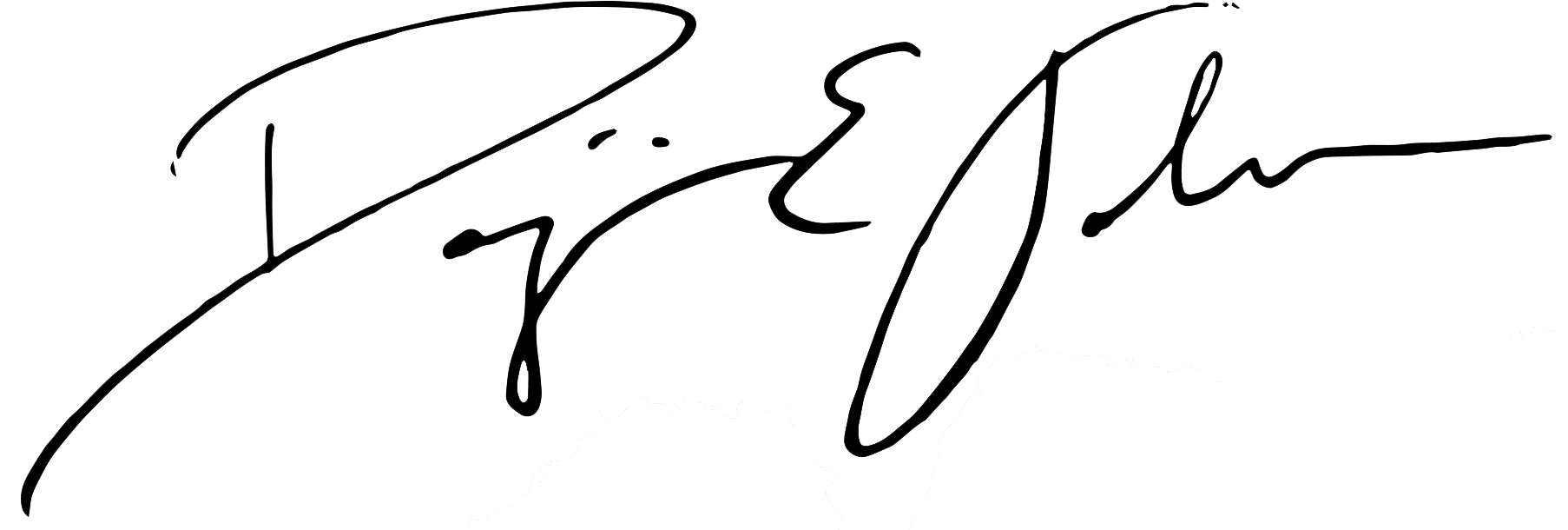
- Signature

Dominique Johnson is an American politician. She is a Democratic member of the Connecticut House of Representatives serving in the 143rd district since 2023.

== Background ==
Johnson became a community organizer in her 20s, and was a data fellow for Barack Obama's 2008 presidential campaign. Johnson became a member of the Norwalk Democratic Town Committee in 2019. She was chosen to fill a vacancy on the Norwalk Common Council in January 2020, and elected for a full term in 2021.

== Connecticut House of Representatives ==
In the 2022 election, Johnson was elected to the Connecticut House of Representatives, replacing Stephanie Thomas. Her district encompasses portions of Norwalk and Westport, Connecticut. She is a member of the state legislature's LGBTQ+ caucus.
