= Theresa Stroffolino =

American politician (died 1976)

Member of the Connecticut House of Representatives from the 143rd district
- In office 1972 – January 1973
- Preceded by: Louis J. Stroffolino
- Succeeded by: John Grennell Matthews

Personal details
- Born: 1911 or 1912
- Died: November 16, 1976 (aged 64)
- Party: Republican
- Spouse: Louis J. Stroffolino (died 1972)
- Children: 2

Theresa Stroffolino (1911 or 1912 – November 16, 1976) was an American politician who served in the Connecticut House of Representatives from 1972 to 1973, representing the 143rd district as a Republican. Stroffolino's predecessor was her husband, Louis J. Stroffolino, who died in office in 1972. Stroffolino was elected to serve the remainder of his unexpired term in a November 1972 special election, and she served until January 1973, when she was succeeded by fellow Republican John Grennell Matthews.
