= Connecticut's 143rd House of Representatives district =

American legislative district

Connecticut's 143rd State House of Representatives district
Representative
Dominique Johnson; D–Norwalk

Connecticut's 143rd House of Representatives district elects one member of the Connecticut House of Representatives. It is represented by Dominique Johnson. The district consisted of parts of Norwalk, Westport, and Wilton until the 2021 redistricting, when it was redrawn to include only portions of Norwalk and Westport.

== List of representatives ==
List of Representatives from Connecticut's 143rd State House District
Representative	Party	Years	District home	Note
Louis J. Stroffolino	Republican	1967 – 1972	Westport	
Theresa Stroffolino	Republican	1972 – 1973	Westport	
John Grennell Matthews	Republican	1973 – 1979	New Canaan	Redistricted from the 161st District. Served in the Connecticut Senate
Yorke Allen Jr.	Republican	1979 – 1984	New Canaan	
Leslie Young	Republican	1984 – 1996	New Canaan	died in office on March 21, 1996
Stuart A. Smith	Democratic	1996 – 1997	Wilton	Elected in a May 1996 special election
Toni Boucher	Republican	1997 – 2009	Wilton	
Peggy Reeves	Democratic	2009 – 2011	Wilton	
Gail Lavielle	Republican	2011 – 2021	Wilton	
Stephanie Thomas	Democratic	2021 – 2023	Norwalk	Became Connecticut Secretary of State.
Dominique Johnson	Democratic	2023 – incumbent	Norwalk	

== Recent Election Results ==
=== 2022 ===
2022 Connecticut State House of Representatives election, 143rd District
Party	Candidate	Votes	%
Democratic	Dominique Johnson	5,359	56.68
Republican	Nicole Hampton	3,797	40.16
Independent Party	Nicole Hampton	150	1.59
Working Families	Dominique Johnson	149	1.58
Total votes		9,455	100.0

=== 2020 ===
2020 Connecticut State House of Representatives election, District 143
Party	Candidate	Votes	%
Democratic	Stephanie Thomas	8,105	53.70
Republican	Patrizia Zucaro	6,409	42.47
Independent Party	Patrizia Zucaro	321	2.13
Working Families	Stephanie Thomas	257	1.70
Total votes		15,092	100.00
Democratic gain from Republican			
