= Gail Lavielle =

American politician

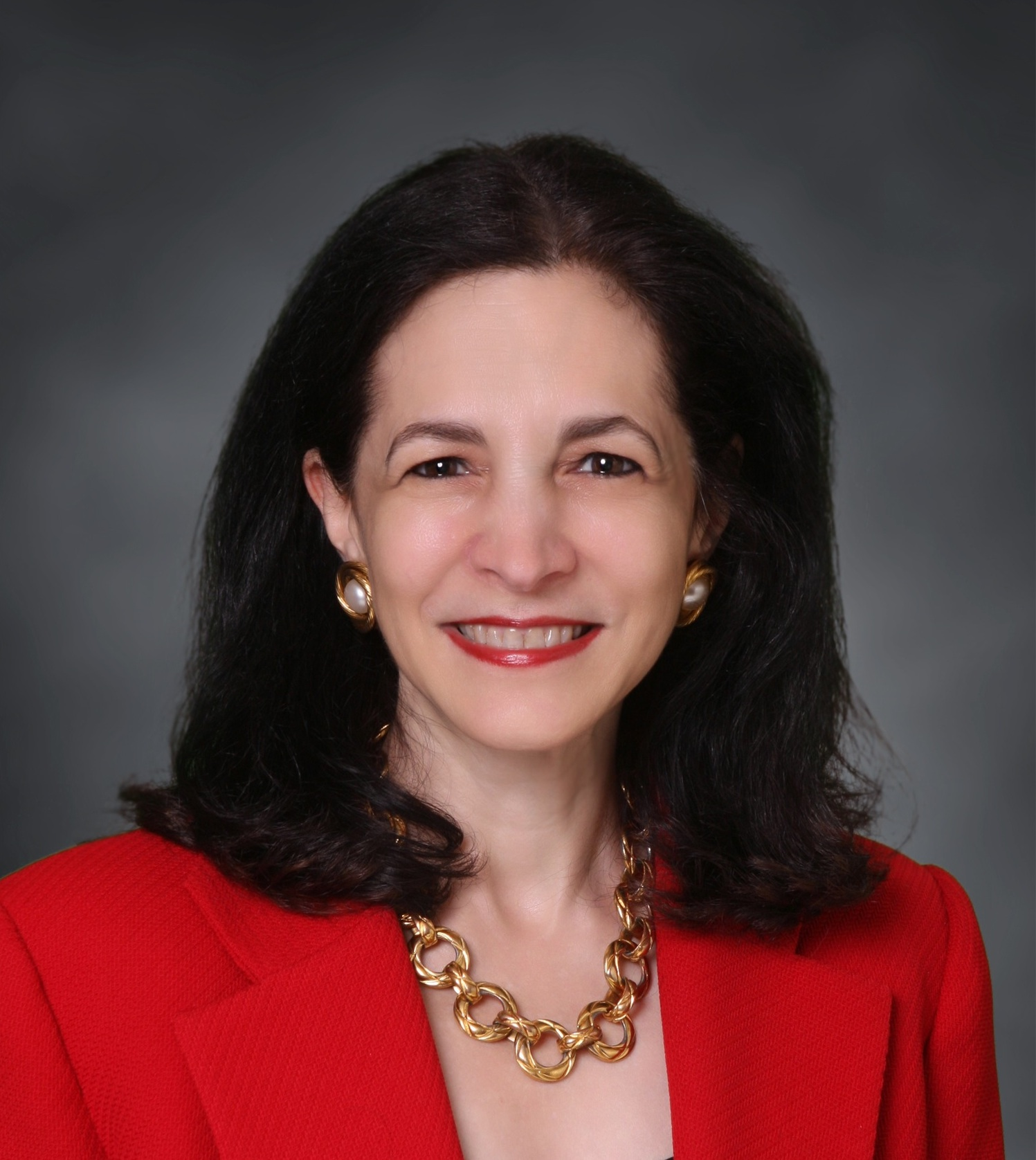

Member of the Connecticut House of Representatives from the 143rd district
- In office January 5, 2011 – January 6, 2021

Personal details
- Born: Houston, Texas, U.S.
- Party: Republican
- Spouse: Jean-Pierre S. Lavielle
- Education: Cornell University (BA); Yale University (MA); University of Connecticut (MBA)
- Website: www.replavielle.com

Gail Lavielle is a former member of the Connecticut House of Representatives, where she represented the 143rd district. The district included parts of Wilton, Norwalk, and, following redistricting in 2012, Westport. Representative Lavielle, an Assistant House Minority Leader, was the House Ranking Member of the Connecticut General Assembly's Appropriations Committee, and served on the Transportation and Education Committees. During her 10 years in the legislature, she also served on the Finance, Revenue, and Bonding Committee and Higher Education Committee and as House Ranking Member of both the Education Committee and the Commerce Committee.

Lavielle was first elected to the House on November 2, 2010, defeating the incumbent and winning the election in both the Wilton and Norwalk parts of the 143rd District. She served for five two-year terms and did not run for a sixth term in 2020.

== Early life and education ==
Lavielle was born in Houston, Texas. She earned a Bachelor of Arts degree in English from Cornell University, a Master of Arts in French from Yale University, and a Master of Business Administration from the University of Connecticut.

== Career Outside of Elective Office ==
Lavielle has worked for more than 25 years in finance and communication. She began her career at JP Morgan, completing training in corporate finance and then heading international advertising. She subsequently held executive leadership positions with Fortune 500 corporations in both France and the United States, including media relations at Walmart and chief executive (Président-Directeur Général) of a Paris subsidiary of the Interpublic Group and Senior Vice President of Suez Environnement.

As a music critic, her reviews appeared in The Wall Street Journal and other publications; she is also the author of a book on opera.

Lavielle served on the Education Commission of the States, the Connecticut Public Transportation Commission, the Connecticut Advisory Council for Professional Standards for School Administrators, and the Governor's task force on rail station parking and access, as well as the Wilton Board of Finance, the Wilton Energy Commission, and the Norwalk River Valley Trail steering committee. She is a former member of the board of directors of the Norwalk Senior Center and the Child Guidance Center of Mid-Fairfield County, and was an advisory council member of Wilton Go Green.

In 2021, after leaving elective office, she was named a board director of several organizations. One is the Center for Workforce Inclusion, a national nonprofit in Washington, DC, that works to provide meaningful employment opportunities for older individuals. Another is the William F. Buckley Program at Yale, which aims to promote intellectual diversity, expand political discourse on campus, and expose students to often-unvoiced views at Yale University. She also serves on the board of the Helicon Foundation, which explores chamber music in its historical context by presenting and producing period performances, including an annual subscription series of four Symposiums in New York featuring both performance and discussion of chamber music. She is also a board director of the American Hospital of Paris Foundation, which provides funding support for the operations of the American Hospital of Paris and functions as the link between the Hospital and the United States, funding many collaborative and exchange programs with New York-Presbyterian Hospital. She is also a Fellow of the Yankee Institute for Public Policy, a research and citizen education organization that focuses on free markets and limited government, as well as issues of transparency and good governance.

== Awards and Recognitions ==
- 2011: Tip of the Cap Award for education advocacy, from ConnCAN (Connecticut Coalition for Achievement Now)
- 2012: Environmental Champion, from the Connecticut League of Conservation Voters
- 2012: "Woman of the Year", from the Homebuilders and Remodelers Association of Fairfield County
- 2013: Stepping Up for Children Award, from Stepping Stones Museum for Children in Norwalk, CT
- 2013: "Children's Champion", from Connecticut Early Childhood Alliance
- 2013: Environmental Champion and Transportation Leader, from the Connecticut League of Conservation Voters
- 2014: Environmental Champion and Transportation Leader, from the Connecticut League of Conservation Voters
- 2015: "Children's Champion", from Connecticut Early Childhood Alliance
- 2015: Environmental Champion and Transportation Leader, from the Connecticut League of Conservation Voters
- 2015: Humanitarian Award for commitment to people with special needs and their families, from STAR, Inc. in Norwalk, CT
- 2015: Parent & Child Hero Award, from CT Parent Power
- 2016: "Children's Champion", from Connecticut Early Childhood Alliance
- 2016: Environmental Champion and Leader on Public Water Supply Issues, from the Connecticut League of Conservation Voters
- 2017: Torchbearer Award for education advocacy for all Connecticut students, from the NECSN
- 2017: Environmental Champion, from the Connecticut League of Conservation Voters
- 2018: "Children's Champion", from Connecticut Early Childhood Alliance
- 2019: Environmental Champion, from the Citizens Campaign for the Environment
- 2019: Environmental Champion, from the Connecticut League of Conservation Voters
- 2020: Town Crier Award, from COST - the Connecticut Council of Small Towns

Preceded by Peggy Reeves	Connecticut House of Representatives; 143rd Assembly District; 2011–2021	Succeeded by Stephanie Thomas
