= Scrutineer =

Person who observes any process that requires oversight

A scrutineer (also called a poll-watcher or a bad challenger in the United States) is a person who observes any process that requires rigorous oversight. Scrutineers are responsible for preventing corruption and detecting genuine mistakes and problems. The scrutineering process most commonly surfaces alongside voting in an election. The scrutineer observes the counting of ballot papers to ensure that election rules are followed. There are other uses of the concept; in motorsport, a scrutineer is responsible for ensuring that vehicles meet the technical regulations.

== Politics ==
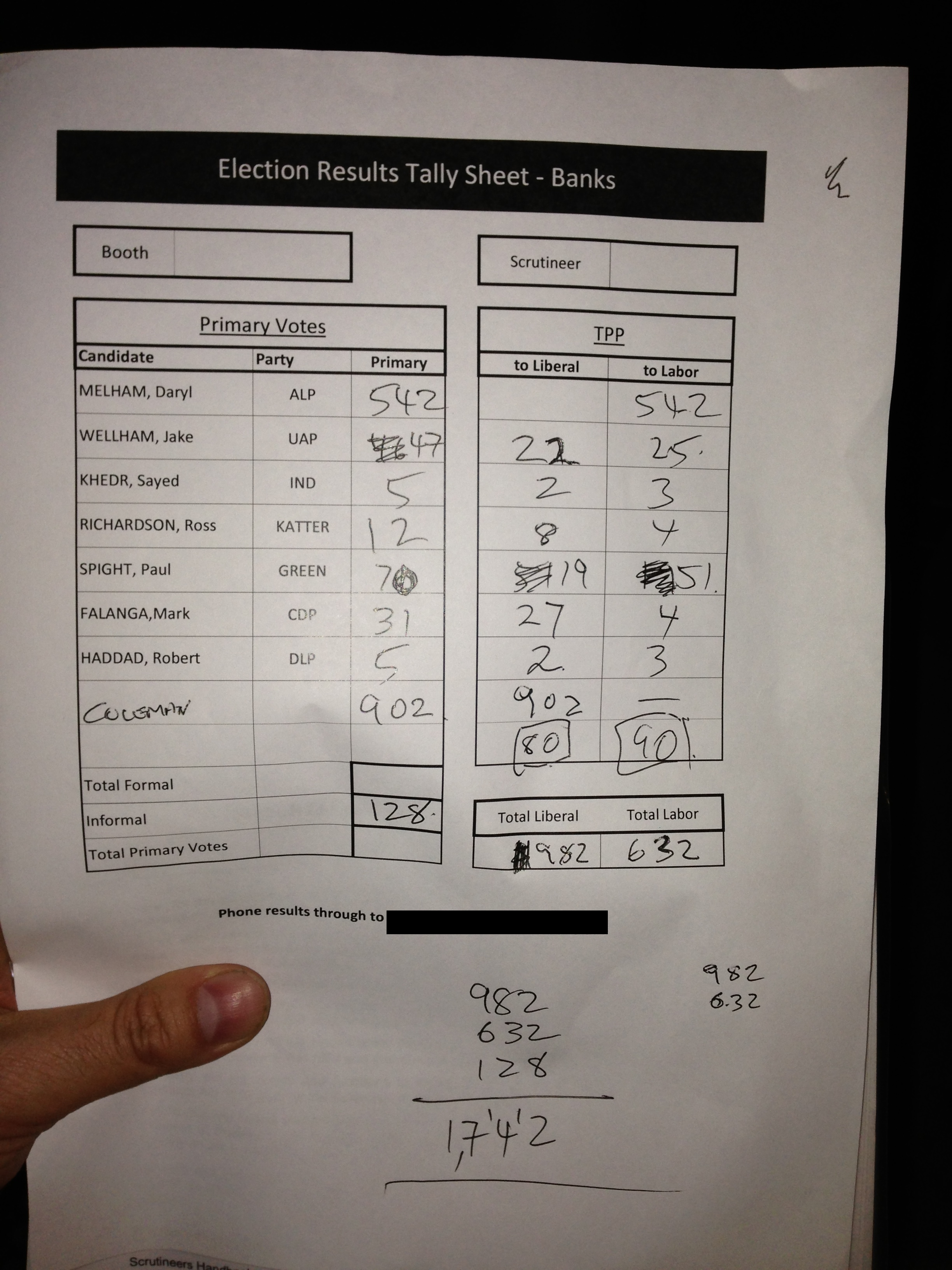
Scrutineer sheet for the 2013 Australian federal election

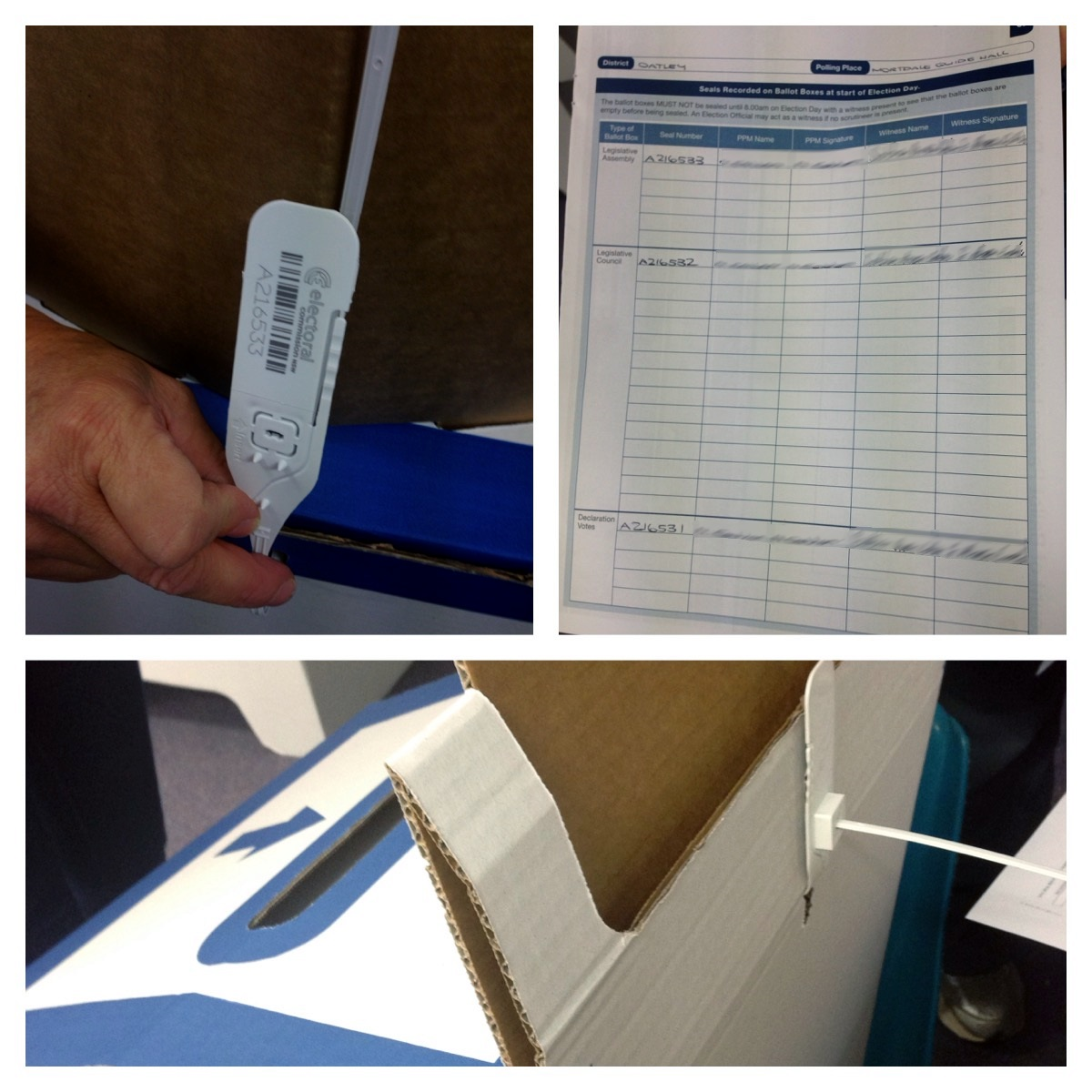
One formal duty of an election scrutineer involves verifying that the ballot boxes are empty when sealed and that the seals have not been tampered with at the end of polling

Rules vary concerning the number of scrutineers from a political party who are allowed to be present at each polling station. In some jurisdictions, each candidate or party may have one scrutineer or poll-watcher per constituency or precinct where voting or counting takes place. In other jurisdictions, such as in Australia and Canada, each party is permitted to appoint one or two scrutineers per polling booth. Scrutineers are often required to refrain from contact with voters, from wearing or displaying political slogans, or from otherwise exerting influence on the conduct of the election while it is taking place. Scrutineers may also report back unofficial results to their campaign headquarters, as the official results can take some time to be issued.

== Sport ==
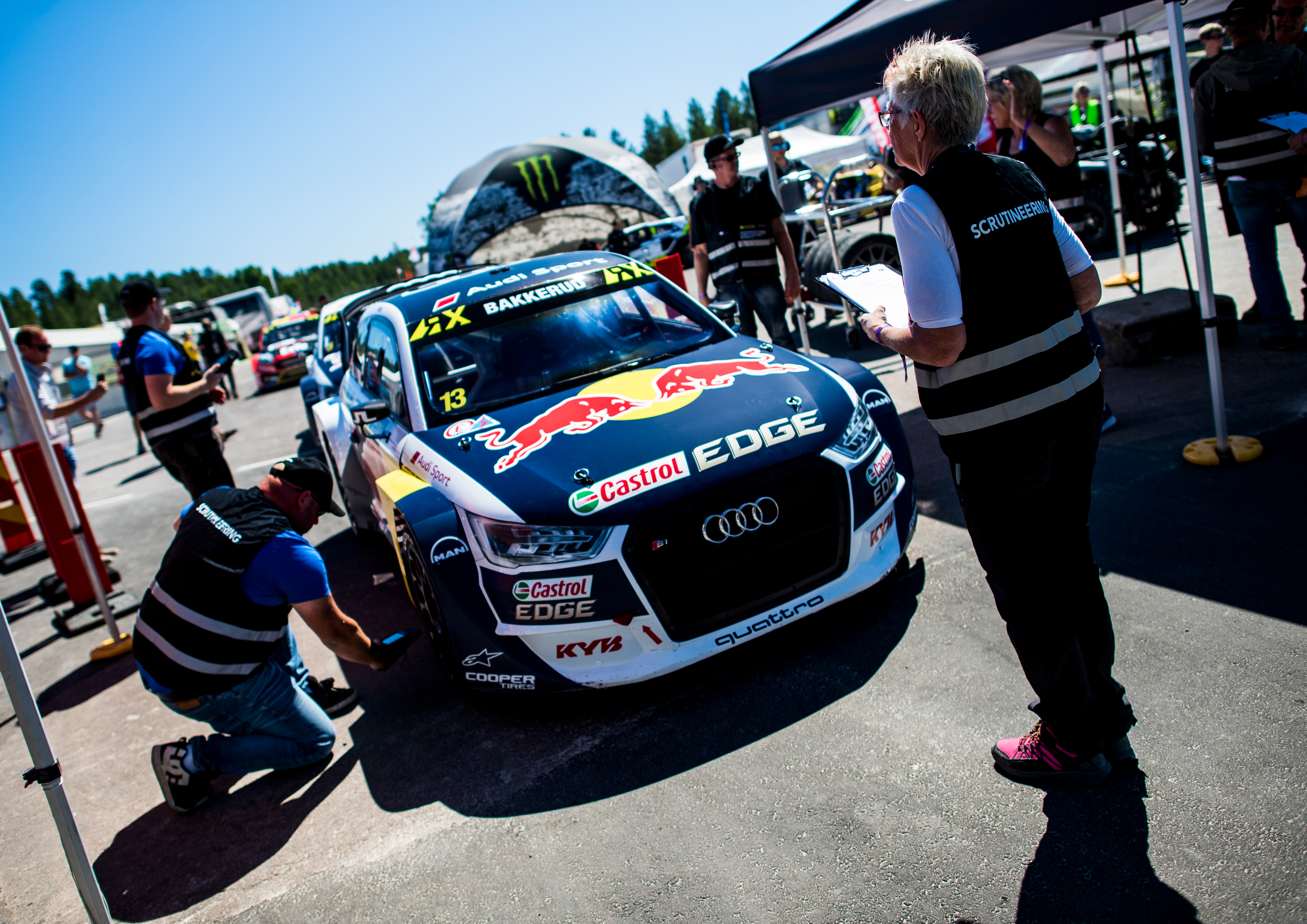
Scrutineers inspects a world rallycross supercar at the 2018 World RX of Sweden.

Scrutineers play an important role in many motorsports. Racing series typically have a set of technical regulations to which the cars, bikes, or other vehicles must conform. The role of the scrutineer in this case is to confirm that vehicles entered for the race meet the relevant regulations.

== Design and engineering ==
In the context of design and engineering, a scrutineer is someone who carefully verifies the accuracy of technical specifications, drawings, or configurations as they apply to a specific discipline or field.

== Competitive dance ==
Dancing competitions (especially dancesport) employ (usually professionally certified) officials who oversee judging and tabulate scores. Software is often used to aid with tabulation.

== See also ==
- Election monitoring
