= Electronic Registration Information Center =

Nonprofit, nonpartisan membership organization

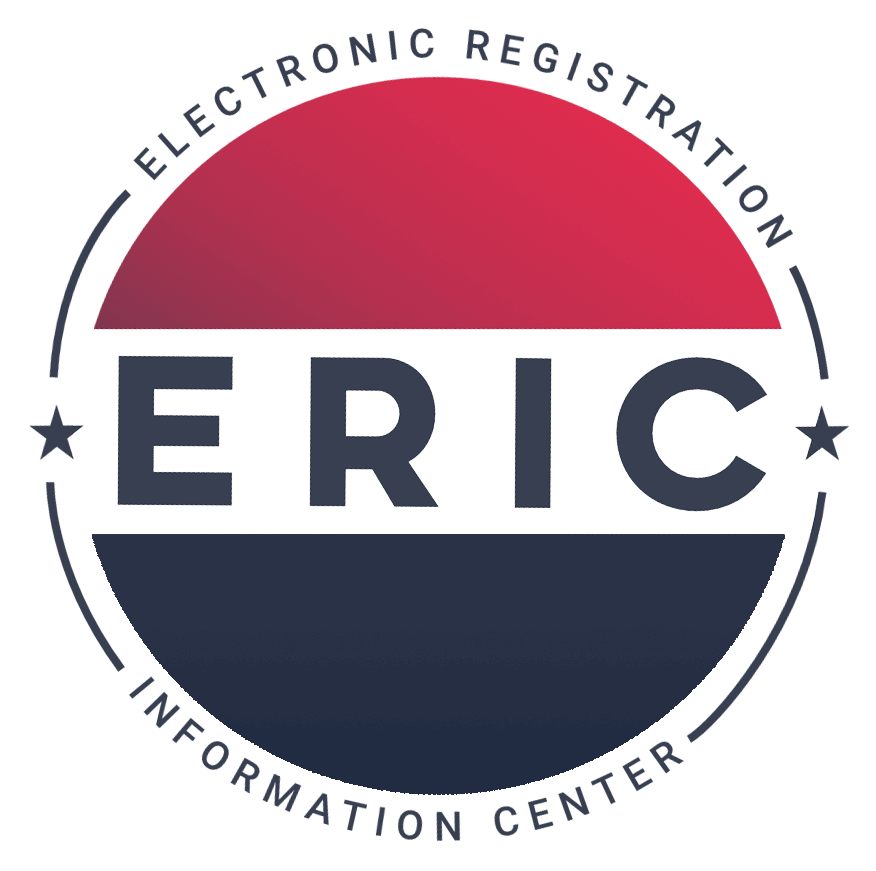
- Abbreviation: ERIC
- Type: 501(c)(3)
- Tax ID no.: 45-5389681
- Legal status: Nonprofit organization
- Purpose: To help states improve the accuracy of America's voter rolls, increase access to voter registration for all eligible citizens, reduce election costs, and increase efficiencies in elections.
- Chair: Stuart Holmes
- Website: ericstates.org

ERIC (Electronic Registration Information Center) member states.

The Electronic Registration Information Center (ERIC) is an American nonprofit organization in the United States whose goal is to improve electoral integrity by helping states improve the accuracy of voter rolls, increase access to voter registration, reduce election costs, and increase efficiencies in elections. ERIC is operated and financed by state election agencies and chief election officials.

== Operations ==
At least every 60 days, each ERIC state submits its voter registration data and motor vehicle licensing data to ERIC. ERIC's technical staff matches this data against data from all the other member states and Social Security death data. ERIC identifies voters who have moved, voters who have died, and voters with duplicate registrations within a state's database. States may also request National Change of Address (NCOA) reports using official data from the US Postal Service and, after federal general elections, participate in a fraud check to see if voters cast ballots in more than one state. By matching voter data against motor vehicle licensing data, ERIC also identifies individuals who are not yet registered so election officials can provide information on how to register to vote.

States joining ERIC have agreed to pursue nonpartisan and protective goals. Participating states are required to mail notifications to people identified as eligible to vote but not registered. Between 2012 and 2018, ERIC identified 26 million persons who were eligible to cast ballots but were not registered to vote, as well as 10 million registered voters who had moved, or who appeared on more than one list. Follow-up research in some states concluded that 10-20% of those contacted had later registered to vote, a high response rate for direct mailings. That rate suggests 2.6 million to 5.2 million of the 26 million people notified became voters.

ERIC’s list maintenance reports help states improve the accuracy of their voter lists by identifying voters who have moved within the state, voters who have moved from one ERIC state to another, voters who have died, and voters with duplicate registrations in the state. ERIC's Membership Agreement requires each state to request and act on at least one of these reports at a minimum of once a year, though the ERIC Membership Agreement strongly encourages states to establish a regular schedule for requesting these reports. States must act on these reports in a manner that complies with applicable federal and state law. ERIC's website publishes statistics on the number of deceased voters, in-state and out-of-state movers, and duplicate registrations that it has reported to member states.

Maryland and Illinois state administrators said determining a person's current home address can present problems. Member states report that "false positives" are rare. Unopened returned mail—evidence of a wrong address—is substantially reduced.

== History ==
Seven states initially created ERIC to improve the accuracy of state voter registration rolls and boost access to voter registration for all American citizens. ERIC was launched in 2012 by elections officials from seven states with logistical and financial support from the Pew Charitable Trusts. As of October 2024, membership includes 24 states and the District of Columbia. The Pew Charitable Trusts, although integral to the creation of ERIC, now has no role in ERIC.

The seven states that created ERIC in 2012 were Colorado, Delaware, Maryland, Nevada, Utah, Virginia, and Washington. By 2019, Alabama, Alaska, Arizona, Connecticut, Florida, Georgia, Illinois, Iowa, Kentucky, Louisiana, Michigan, Minnesota, Missouri, New Mexico, Ohio, Oregon, Pennsylvania, Rhode Island, South Carolina, Vermont, West Virginia, and Wisconsin had joined the partnership, with Texas joining in March 2020 and Oklahoma adopting legislation to join in April 2021. ERIC's matching software was developed by data scientist Jeff Jonas. In the 2020-2021 fiscal year, its budget was slightly more than $1 million.

In 2022, The Gateway Pundit, a conservative news website that does not follow industry standards of credibility and transparency, published a number of articles implying the program was part of a left-wing election conspiracy, despite the participation of both Democratic and Republican-led states.

Various conservative campaigns opposing the program have emerged since the Gateway Pundit series. According to The New York Times, ERIC received seed funding from the Pew Charitable Trusts. Because businessman George Soros had previously donated to the Pew Trusts, opponents of ERIC accused the program of being a "voter registration vehicle for Democrats." However, the Pew Charitable Trusts' funding of ERIC was separate from Soros' donations.

Under pressure from right-wing activists, nine states with Republican leadership have exited the program. In January 2022, Secretary of State of Louisiana Kyle Ardoin announced that Louisiana would suspend its participation in ERIC, then fully withdrew in July 2022. Alabama withdrew from the program in January 2023, after Secretary of State of Alabama Wes Allen made exiting ERIC one of his campaign issues. Florida, Missouri, and West Virginia announced their withdrawals on March 6, 2023. Later the same month, Ohio also withdrew from ERIC; Ohio Secretary of State Frank LaRose had previously defended the organization but changed course, saying that ERIC had "double[d]-down on poor strategic decisions".

In February 2023, Alabama Secretary of State Wes Allen, who had previously withdrawn Alabama from ERIC, released a statement reporting that he had visited the address given by ERIC for its office. Allen said that he found the office totally vacant with "no ERIC presence of any kind" and that it instead was a rentable "virtual office". ERIC Executive Director Shane Hamlin responded by stating that the address was meant only for mailing purposes and that ERIC has never had physical brick and mortar offices since its founding. According to ERIC's website, ERIC does not disclose the location of any of its servers for safety reasons.

In October 2023, Alabama announced that a new program, called AVID or the Alabama Voter Integrity Database, will use federal and other state data to monitor voter information as a replacement for ERIC.

Effective June 2023, Iowa ended its membership in ERIC. Iowa Secretary of State Paul Pate's office explained the decision was based on multiple states leaving ERIC resulted in reduced data making it less effective and Iowa no longer agreed with ERIC rules requiring all member states to abide with its bylaws. One of the main complaints was how ERIC requires member states to perform outreach to unregistered voters to encourage them to register.

It was announced that Virginia was withdrawing from ERIC in August 2023. Virginia's commissioner of elections Susan Beals said concerns about data security and stewardship were the basis of her decision.

In July 2023, Texas finalized its departure from the organization, leaving only five Republican-leaning states still retaining membership. With the departure of Texas, a total of nine states had left the organization in the 18 months leading up to July 2023. The states, in order of departure, are Louisiana, Alabama, Missouri, Florida, West Virginia, Iowa, Ohio, Virginia, and Texas.

NPR has reported that far-right conspiracy theorists claimed that ERIC was not impartial, though there were at the time as many Republican as Democratic members.

Despite several attempts to do so, states departing ERIC have yet to replace it with an alternate system that addresses election integrity concerns.

In July 2024, Hawaii joined ERIC.

In December 2025, New York's governor Kathy Hochul signed a bill to require the state to join ERIC.

In March 2026, Virginia's governor Abigail Spanberger signed an executive order directing the Commissioner of Elections to rejoin ERIC.

== Governance ==
Each state has a seat on ERIC's board of directors. The board has created an executive committee and advisory committees to assist with issues related to data security and research. Key responsibilities of the board of directors include approving the annual budget, setting annual membership dues, and a periodic review of ERIC's Information Security Plan and policies. ERIC is governed by bylaws and a membership agreement that each state must sign before joining.

== See also ==
- Electoral integrity
- Interstate Voter Registration Crosscheck Program (defunct)
