= Republican efforts to restrict voting following the 2020 United States presidential election =

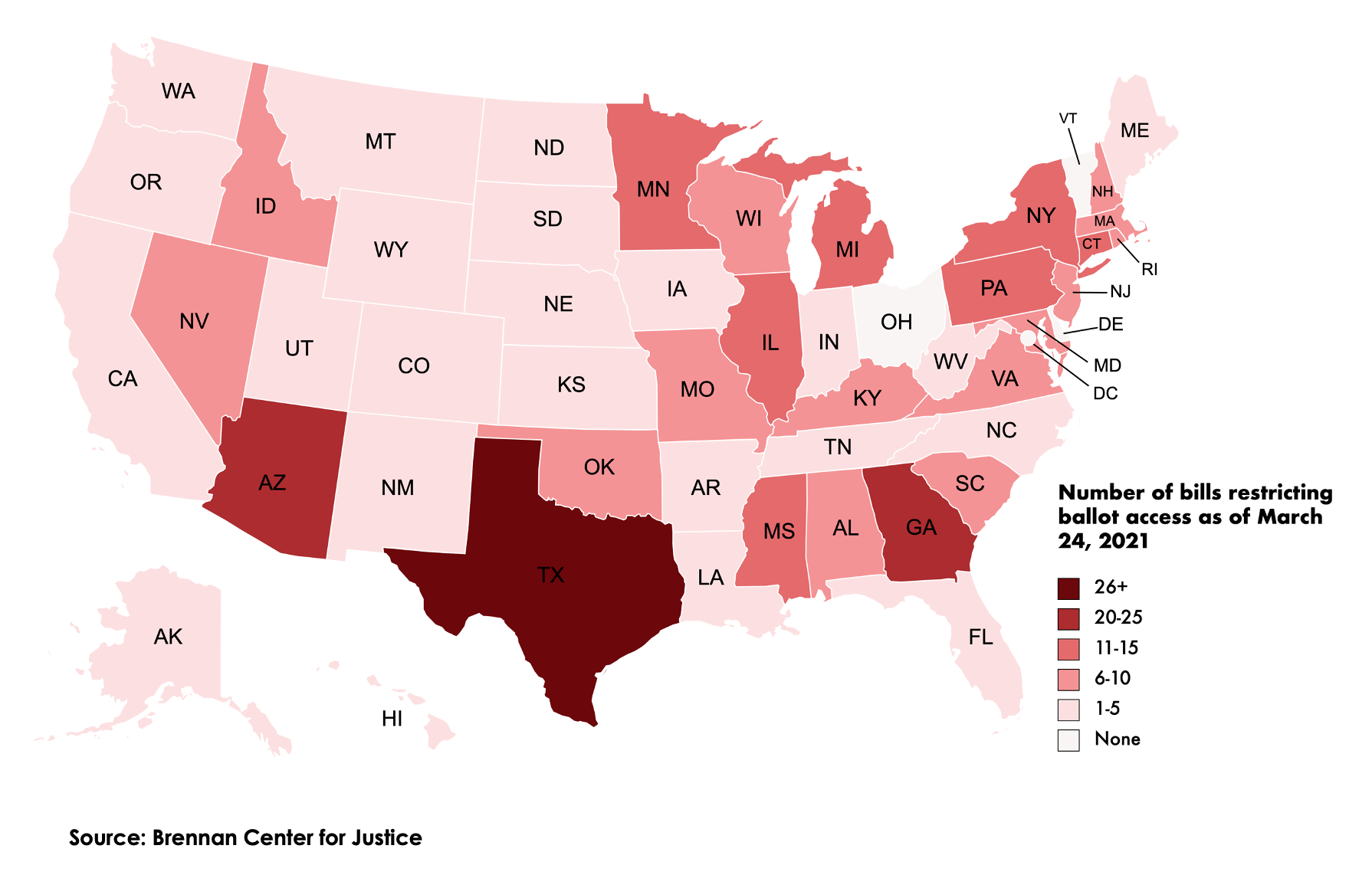
Number of bills restricting ballot access introduced after the 2020 presidential election as of March 24, 2021

Following the 2020 United States presidential election and the unsuccessful attempts by Donald Trump and various other Republican officials to overturn it, Republican lawmakers initiated a sweeping effort to make voting laws more restrictive within several states across the country. According to the Brennan Center for Justice, as of October 4, 2021, more than 425 bills that would restrict voting access have been introduced in 49 states—with 33 of these bills enacted across 19 states so far. The bills are largely centered around limiting mail-in voting, strengthening voter ID laws, shortening early voting, eliminating automatic and same-day voter registration, curbing the use of ballot drop boxes, and allowing for increased purging of voter rolls. Republicans in at least eight states have also introduced bills that would give lawmakers greater power over election administration after they were unsuccessful in their attempts to overturn election results in swing states won by Democratic candidate Joe Biden in the 2020 election. The efforts garnered press attention and public outrage from Democrats, and by 2023 Republicans had adopted a more "under the radar" approach to achieve their goals.

Supporters of the bills argue they would improve election security and reverse temporary changes enacted during the COVID-19 pandemic; they point to false claims of significant election fraud, as well as the substantial public distrust of the integrity of the 2020 election those claims have fostered, (Note: According to an NPR/PBS NewsHour/Marist poll, while more than 60% of Americans believe the 2020 election was secure, a large majority of Republican voters say they do not trust the results of the 2020 election. According to a poll by Quinnipiac, 77% of Republicans believe there was widespread voter fraud.) as reasons to tighten election laws. Opponents argue that the efforts amount to voter suppression, are intended to advantage Republicans by reducing the number of people who vote, (Note: While it is sometimes true that higher voter turnout disadvantages Republicans, evidence in recent years has been mixed. For example, a 2021 study by Stanford University concluded that the expansion of mail-in voting in the 2020 presidential election did not produce a partisan benefit for either party.) and would disproportionately affect minority voters; they point to reports that the 2020 election was one of the most secure in American history (Note: No evidence has been found of significant levels of fraud. This has been affirmed by multiple reports, including: Report from the Cybersecurity and Infrastructure Security Agency (CISA): "The November 3rd election was the most secure in American history...There is no evidence that any voting system deleted or lost votes, changed votes, or was in any way compromised."; Conclusion of the United States Justice Department: According to then-Attorney General William Barr, the Justice Department found no evidence of widespread voter fraud that could change the outcome of the 2020 election.; Conclusion of the Federal Bureau of Investigation (FBI): According to Director of the FBI Christopher Wray, "We have not seen, historically, any kind of coordinated national voter fraud effort in a major election, whether it's by mail or otherwise."; Election observers from the Organization of American States: According to Business Insider, "A team of 28 international election observers said it found no evidence of voter fraud in the 2020 election".; Election officials: According to The New York Times, "Election officials in dozens of states representing both political parties said that there was no evidence that fraud or other irregularities played a role in the outcome of the presidential race".; Courts: Over 50 court cases were launched challenging the results of the 2020 election. No judge found evidence of significant voter fraud.) to counter claims that election laws need to be tightened and argue that public distrust in the 2020 election arises from falsehoods pushed by Republicans, especially former president Donald Trump.

The insistence by Trump and Republicans that the election had been stolen from him by fraud came to be characterized as an implementation of "the big lie" and was also used by Republicans to justify efforts to take control of the administrative management of elections at the state and local level.

== Background ==
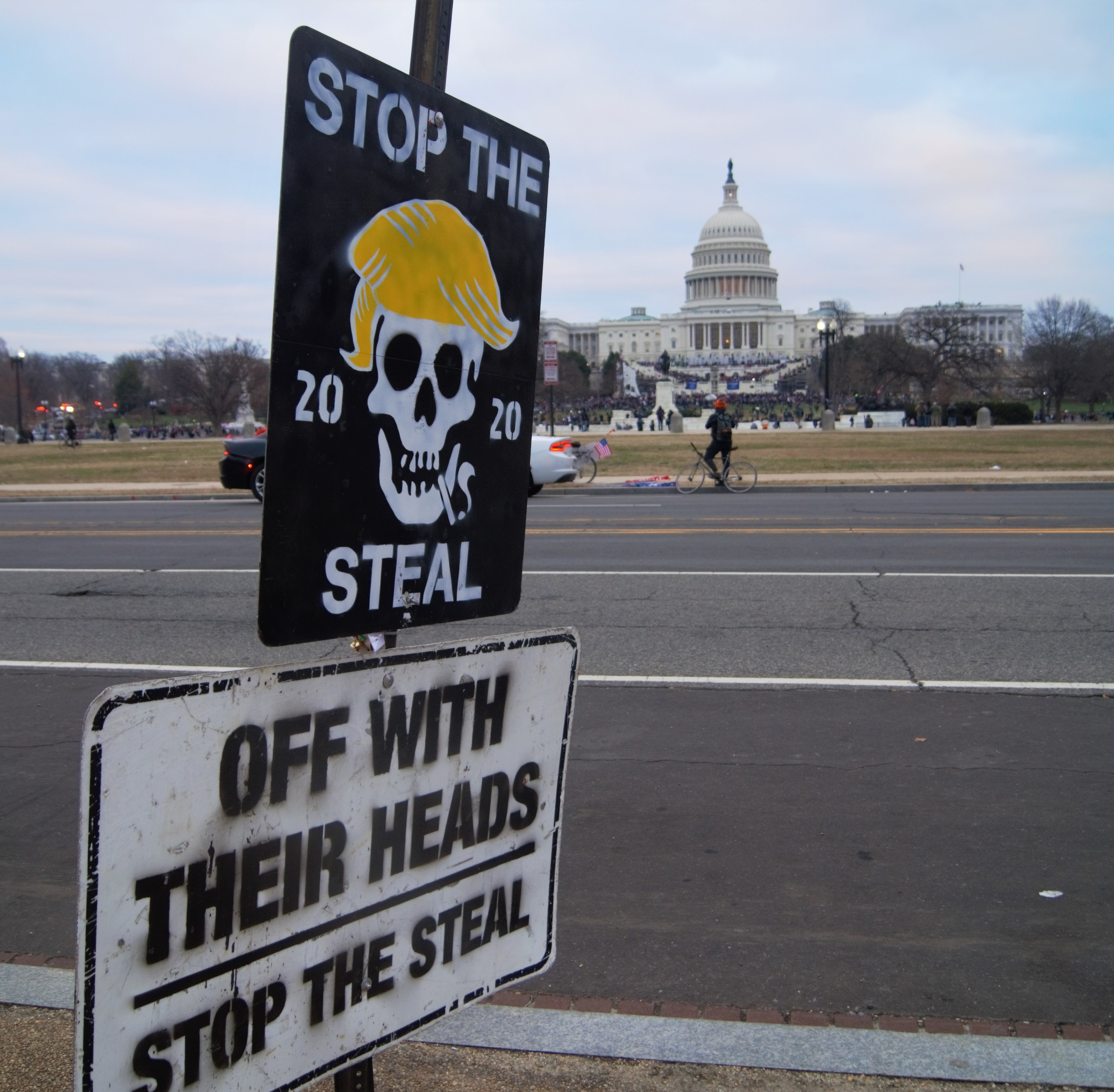
Stop the Steal signs seen in the United States Capitol attack on January 6, 2021

=== Historical efforts ===
For decades, the Republican Party has supported election integrity initiatives—measures to reduce voter fraud (which is exceedingly rare in the United States) but which critics have alleged are attempts at voter suppression. As summarized by the Associated Press, "stronger voting regulations have long been a conservative goal, driven by old – and some say outdated – conventional wisdom that Republicans thrive in elections with lower turnout, and Democrats in ones with more voters. That has translated to GOP efforts to tighten voter identification laws and require more frequent voter roll purges. Both efforts tend to disproportionally exclude Black and Latino voters, groups that lean Democratic."

In recent history, there have been several waves of voter restriction proposals. Several proposals followed 2000 presidential election when, according to Lawrence Norden, "political operatives realized that small shifts in voting laws could potentially alter the outcome of an election". Another period of increased proposals came in 2013, when the Supreme Court struck down the preclearance provision of the Voting Rights Act of 1965, which required southern states with histories of racial discrimination in voting to pre-clear any changes to voting administration with the federal government. Finally, there was heightened interest after the 2016 presidential election, which Donald Trump (the winner of the election) claimed was marred by voter fraud. However, the quantity of proposals reached its highest level following the 2020 United States presidential election.

=== 2020 presidential election ===
The 2020 election took place during the COVID-19 pandemic. As a result, many states implemented measures to expand voting access. In particular, mail-in voting (which was seeing significantly increased use in states that already offered no-excuse absentee voting) was expanded in many states. In response, incumbent president Donald Trump spent weeks claiming that mail-in voting would allow the election to be rigged against him. This echoed his 2016 strategy of making unfounded and often conspiratorial claims of voter fraud in the 2016 presidential election. (Note: In fact, it is part of a longstanding pattern of Donald Trump: he has falsely alleged on at least six occasions that an election was rigged against him or his preferred candidate.)

Immediately following the 2020 election, Donald Trump and his allies in the Republican Party used the false claims of electoral fraud Trump had been propounding for months, as well as a fabricated narrative of an international communist conspiracy involving Hugo Chavez and Dominion Voting Systems, as pretext to initiate an unprecedented effort to overturn the victory of Democratic candidate Joe Biden. (Note: The attempts to overturn the election have been described by some commentators and political scientists as an attempted coup d'état (technically a "self-coup" or "autogolpe").) They launched over 60 lawsuits, encouraged officials in states with narrow Biden victories to challenge vote certification processes, and attempted to reject the results of several states Biden had won during the congressional certification of the Electoral College results, including by trying to force Vice President Mike Pence to reject those states' electoral votes. Supporters of Trump engaged in a "Stop the Steal" protest movement, while conservative media networks and political commentators, including Newsmax, One America News Network, and Fox News commentators like Sean Hannity and Lou Dobbs, amplified claims that Biden's win was illegitimate. Trump personally pressured Georgia Secretary of State Brad Raffensperger to "find 11,780 votes" (the number of votes needed to flip the state), repeatedly urged Georgia governor Brian Kemp to convene a special session of the legislature to overturn Biden's certified victory in the state, and fired the director of the Cybersecurity and Infrastructure Security Agency (CISA) shortly after the director refuted claims of election fraud. The effort ultimately culminated in the 2021 storming of the United States Capitol, in which supporters of Donald Trump occupied the Capitol building in an unsuccessful attempt to prevent Congress from certifying the results of the Electoral College. Trump was impeached but not convicted for his role in inciting the mob.

As a result of this effort, more than half of Republicans believed that the election was stolen from Donald Trump. This belief, often referred to as the "Big Lie", has supercharged Republican voting reform efforts, with Republican officials frequently citing false claims of election fraud or the fact that many in the public believe there was fraud as reason to tighten election laws. The effort has also been linked to an attempt to entrench minority rule for the Republican Party. According to The New York Times, "Out of power in both Congress and the White House, the [Republican] party views its path to regaining a foothold in Washington not solely through animated opposition to Mr. Biden's agenda, but rather through an intense focus on re-engineering the voting system in states where it holds control". Additionally, some Republican politicians and conservative commentators have argued that some "low-quality" people shouldn't be able to vote.

Altogether, this has led to a concerted effort to enact voting restrictions, particularly on mail-in and early voting, automatic and same-day voter registration, the use of ballot drop boxes, and voting without a photo ID, as well as give partisan lawmakers more control over election administration. It has been particularly pronounced in several swing states—especially traditionally red states that swung to Biden in the 2020 election like Georgia and Arizona—as well as in Texas, a red state that has been trending toward the Democratic Party.

Despite a lack of concrete evidence of election fraud, Trump and his supporters continued to insist he won and claimed that the real "big lie" was the idea that he lost. Some Republican activists continued throughout 2021 to pressure state election officials to examine allegations of fraud, asserting they were acting to protect democracy. Michigan secretary of state Jocelyn Benson, who had been a target of such efforts, characterized it as "a political strategy to break down our democracy and put people in charge of our states who are unaccountable and will act in a way that doesn't reflect the will of the people." Polls indicated a large majority of Republicans continued to agree believe that the election was stolen, leading to not only voting reform laws, but also efforts to control the administrative management of elections. Trump ally Steve Bannon said in December 2021 that "we are going to take over the election apparatus." Fascism scholar Timothy Snyder observed: "The lie is so big that it reorders the world. And so part of telling the big lie is that you immediately say it's the other side that tells the big lie. Sadly, but it's just a matter of record, all of that is in Mein Kampf."

== State laws ==
=== Alabama ===
Lawmakers in Alabama have introduced more than two dozen election-related bills since the 2020 presidential election, including Republican-backed bills that would restrict early and absentee voting. House Bill 285, for instance, would ban curbside voting (the bill passed the Alabama House of Representatives in a party-line vote on March 18, 2021) while another would shorten the time voters have to mail in absentee applications from five days before an election to 10. Republican Rep. Danny Garrett actually proposed a bill that would increase the number of sites that voters can drop off their absentee ballots, which recently passed the Constitution, Campaigns and Elections House committee, but it has faced consternation among other members of his party, with some objecting that it would "provid[e] for early voting". Rep. Chris Pringle, for instance, claimed that it would lead to "primaries that are going to be stolen using this...they're going to bus them in and pack them out". Republicans have also broadly opposed bills proposed by Democratic lawmakers that would authorize no-excuse absentee voting (existing law requires voters to provide a valid excuse) and institute two weeks of early voting.

Following the announcement in early March that Alabama secretary of state John Merrill would be appointed co-chair of the Republican State Leadership Committee's group on election integrity, which is set to make recommendations on new policies related to voter rolls, voter ID, and absentee voting, Republican "election integrity" efforts are expected to accelerate.

=== Arizona ===
Alleging election fraud, in April 2021 Arizona Republicans hired a private firm to conduct an audit of the 2020 presidential election results. The auditors released a report five months later finding no proof of fraud and that their ballot recount increased Biden's margin of victory by 360 votes. County election officials released a final report in January 2022 finding that nearly all of the auditors' allegations of irregularities were false or misleading. After a six-month investigation, Arizona attorney general Mark Brnovich, a Republican running for Senate in 2022, said in April 2022 he found no proof of 2020 election fraud.

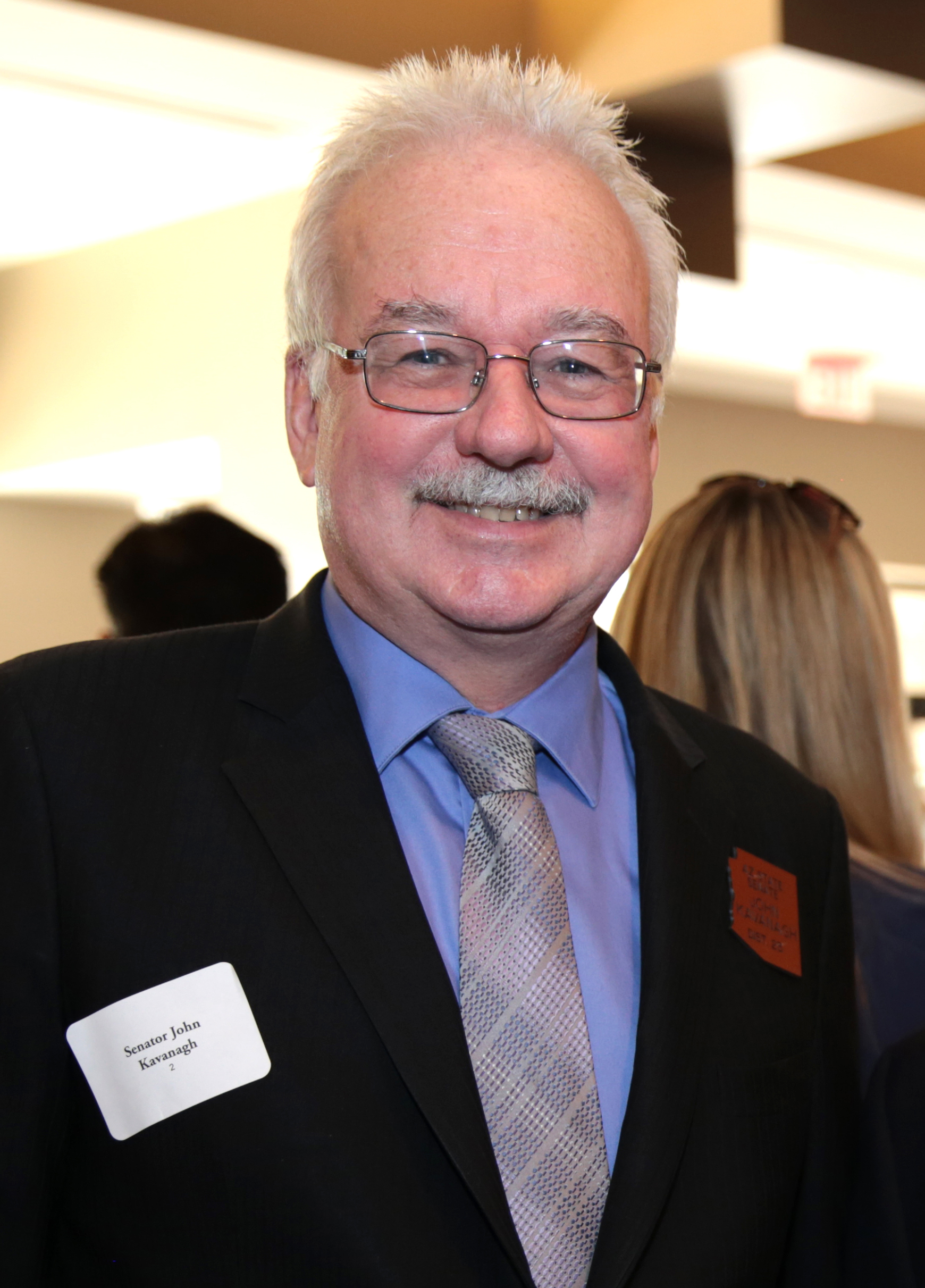
Arizona state Rep. John Kavanagh (R) defended Republican proposals to restrict Arizona's vote-by-mail system by stating: "Everybody shouldn't be voting...quantity is important, but we have to look at the quality of votes, as well."

At least two dozen Republican voting measures have been introduced in Arizona. A measure passed in the Arizona Senate would require voters to include photo identification with mail-in ballots (which account for 80% of ballots cast in Arizona). Proposed bills include provisions that would limit or eliminate no-excuse absentee voting, require signatures on absentee ballots be notarized, allow officials to purge voters from the Permanent Early Voting List (a list of people automatically sent mail-in ballots) if they have not voted in both the primary and general elections for two consecutive cycles, require absentee ballots be turned in by hand rather than by mail, require mail-in ballots be postmarked by the Thursday before the election, even if they arrive by Election Day, preemptively forbid same-day voter registration (which the state does not currently offer), outlaw private donations to help conduct elections, including for voter education, and give the state legislature the power to choose the state's electors in the Electoral College, regardless of the outcome of the state's popular vote. Another proposal would significantly decrease the number of polling locations in the state, including decreasing the number of locations in Maricopa County from 100 to 15. Rep. Athena Salman (D), the top-ranking Democrat on the House Government and Elections Committee, argued that "[Republicans] definitely came in with a plan to make sure the historic voter turnout we saw in 2020 never happens again".

In April 2022, the Arizona Supreme Court dismissed a lawsuit brought by state Republicans to end early voting, including mail-in balloting. More than 80% of Arizona voters use the early voting system that has existed for over 30 years. Mail-in balloting has existed in Arizona for over a century.

=== Arkansas ===
On March 3, 2021, Arkansas governor Asa Hutchinson signed into law House Bill 1112, which eliminates a provision that allows voters to sign a sworn statement in order for their provisional ballots to be counted in lieu of presenting a photo ID. On March 4, 2021, Hutchinson signed into law House Bill 1244, which eliminates non-photo ID's as valid forms of identification to vote. Republicans have also introduced a bill that would shorten early voting (Senate Bill 485).

=== Florida ===
On February 19, 2021, Florida governor Ron DeSantis introduced a slate of voting proposals focused largely on making vote-by-mail more restrictive. These included a ban on vote-by-mail ballots from being automatically sent out to voters, restrictions on ballot boxes, stricter signature verification, a ban on ballot collection, a prohibition on counties accepting financial help from private organizations for get-out-the-vote initiatives and a requirement that counties report voter turnout data in real-time. DeSantis had earlier advocated for faithless electors from states President Donald Trump had lost in the 2020 election to vote for him anyway, circumventing their states' voters.

DeSantis also called for a measure that would cancel current absentee ballot requests for the 2022 gubernatorial election. (Note: Under existing Florida law, requests for absentee ballots last for two general elections. The proposal by DeSantis and state Sen. Dennis Baxley would make requests good for only one year, and they plan to make it retroactive—meaning any requests made after the 2018 general election, which would have applied through the 2022 election, would be cancelled.) The state legislature's Republican leaders announced that they "join the Governor in his efforts to continue to make Florida the national leader on election integrity" and "look forward to working with him on this important issue". According to a Tampa Bay Times analysis, DeSantis's signature match proposal could have led to rejections of his own mail-in ballots due to changes in his signature history over time; voting rights experts argued that the signature matching proposal could be used to disenfranchise voters whose signatures varied over time.

Opponents of the governor's agenda argue that DeSantis used false claims of widespread voter fraud pushed by Trump to advance voter suppression efforts to give advantage to Republicans. Arguing that the measures are politically motivated, they point out that Florida Republicans had praised the state's 2020 election as "the smoothest, most successful election of any state in the country", that the push to limit mail-in voting came only after Democratic voters outnumbered Republican voters in vote-by-mail for the first time in 2020 and that there was no evidence of widespread voter fraud in the 2020 election.

The changes to mail-in voting were notable given that Republicans had traditionally voted by mail more than Democrats, though Democrats had outvoted Republicans by mail in 2020. Fearing that traditionally Republican-leaning constituencies, such as the elderly and members of the military, would vote in lower numbers under stringent mail voting rules, Republicans sought to exempt those two groups from the requirements that other voters would face. However, in Republican negotiations over the language of the legislation, the exemptions were rejected because it would be legally impermissible.

DeSantis officially signed the measures into law on May 6, broadcast live on Fox & Friends. Media outlets that were not Fox News were banned from attending the event.

On March 31, 2022, U.S. District Court Judge Mark E. Walker ruled that Senate Bill 90 violated the Voting Rights Act of 1965. Walker issued a permanent injunction against the law's restrictions on absentee ballot drop boxes and required Florida to obtain preclearance from federal courts before enacting election laws. DeSantis and Florida attorney general Ashley Moody have since appealed Walker's ruling.

=== Georgia ===
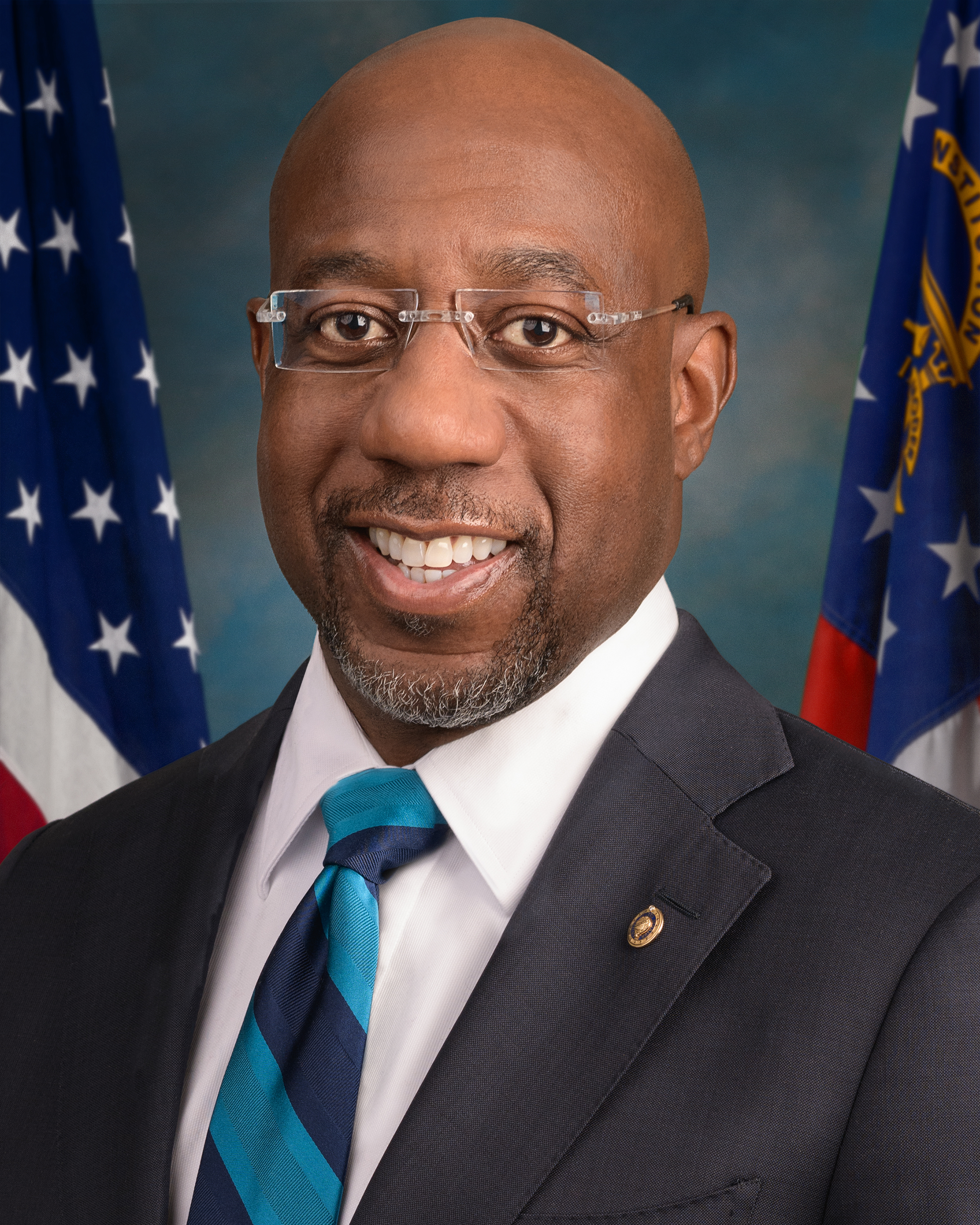
In his first speech on the Senate floor, the newly elected senator from Georgia Raphael Warnock (D) declared that "We are witnessing right now a massive and unabashed assault on voting rights and voter access unlike anything we have seen since the Jim Crow era".

On March 25, 2021, Georgia became the first swing state to impose new voting restrictions following the 2020 presidential election, in which Joe Biden became the first Democratic candidate since 1992 to carry the state (additionally, both of the state's senate seats flipped to the Democratic Party in that year's Senate elections). The 98-page Election Integrity Act of 2021 (SB 202) was the culmination of a months-long flurry of proposals; it includes a great many of the proposals floated, like voter identification requirements for absentee ballots, restrictions on ballot drop boxes, and a prohibition on handing out food and water to voters waiting in line, but drops some of the more controversial proposals, most notably the attempt to ban Sunday early voting, when Black churches traditionally run "Souls to the Polls" get-out-the-vote efforts. Supporters argue the bill is needed to combat voter fraud and restore confidence in the state's elections, which have seen significant decreases in public trust after the state became a focal point of then-President Donald Trump's attempt to overturn the 2020 presidential election, which centered on false claims of widespread voter fraud. Opponents argue that it is little more than an effort to push back against the victories of President Joe Biden and Democratic Senate candidates Jon Ossoff and Raphael Warnock and appears targeted at Black voters, with Democratic voting rights activist Stacey Abrams going so far as to call it "nothing less than Jim Crow 2.0". It also follows a controversial statewide voter roll update in 2019 that a report by the American Civil Liberties Union (ACLU) concluded likely wrongfully removed nearly 200,000 people from voter rolls. The act has already prompted a number of ongoing legal challenges.

The Republican effort began in early January, when Georgia Republicans appointed state representative Barry Fleming chair of the Georgia Special Committee on Election Integrity (as attorney of Hancock County, Fleming had earlier defended a controversial voter roll update that challenged the eligibility of nearly 20% of Sparta, Georgia's residents—almost all Black). By late February, the first elections bill had cleared a chamber of the Georgia General Assembly. Passed in the Georgia State Senate on February 23, 2021, in a nearly party-line vote, Senate Bill 67 would have require a photo ID when requesting an absentee ballot.

Concurrently, a broader elections bill, House Bill 531, was being considered in the Georgia House of Representatives. The bill would have restricted where ballot drop boxes can be located and when they can be accessed, required photo identification for absentee voting, shifted back the deadline to request an absentee ballot, made it a misdemeanor for political organizations to hand out food or drink to voters waiting in line, and limited early voting hours on weekends, among many other changes. Most controversially, it would have restricted early voting on Sundays, when Black churches traditionally run "Souls to the Polls" get-out-the-vote efforts; according to The Economist, Black voter turnout is 10 percentage points higher on Sundays. The Sunday restriction is similar to a North Carolina law that also would have ended Sunday early voting but was struck down in 2016 by a federal court for targeting black voters. (Note: In court, the state defended the law by arguing that "counties with Sunday voting in 2014 were disproportionately black" and "disproportionately Democratic". The court wrote that "in what comes as close to a smoking gun as we are likely to see in modern times, the State's very justification for a challenged statute hinges explicitly on race — specifically its concern that African Americans, who had overwhelmingly voted for Democrats, had too much access to the franchise.") The restriction has been defended on the basis that there should be no voting on the Sabbath. House Bill 531 passed the House in a party-line vote on March 1, 2021. After outcry, the Sunday early voting restriction was dropped in the Senate version of the bill.

While House Bill 531 was being considered in the Senate, and nearing the March 8 deadline a bill must pass one of the two chambers, the Senate passed Senate Bill 241, which would have eliminated no-excuse absentee voting (something the state has offered since 2005), restricting it only to those who are over 65 years old, have a physical disability, or will be out of town on Election Day, and Senate Bill 202, which would have prohibited organizations from sending absentee ballot applications to voters who have already requested a ballot.

On March 12, 2021, the Georgia Chamber of Commerce, an organization representing businesses based in Georgia like Coca-Cola and Home Depot, issued a statement opposing the Republican voting reforms.

As the end of March neared, with no election bill passed by both chambers (the Georgia General Assembly adjourns on March 31), Republicans raced to finalize changes to their election law proposals. Republican efforts consolidated around two omnibus bills: the 45-page House Bill 531, passed in the House on March 1, 2021; and the significantly expanded 95-page Senate Bill 202, passed in the Senate on March 8, 2021. On March 25, 2021, both chambers passed Senate Bill 202, now called the Election Integrity Act of 2021; it was signed into law by Governor Brian Kemp that evening. The bill imposes voter identification requirements on absentee ballots, gives the legislature greater control over election administration, limits the use of ballot drop boxes, reduces the amount of time people have to request an absentee ballot, and makes it a crime for political organizations to give food or water to voters waiting in line (although poll workers are still allowed to). It also shortens runoff elections—a Republican priority in the state after both of its 2020 Senate runoffs were won by the Democratic candidates (Note: 2020 saw major losses for the Republican Party in Georgia, a southern state that had two Republican senators going into the 2020 election and has been a solidly red state in presidential elections since the 1990s. Not only did it flip blue in the presidential election, but both of its Senate seats flipped to the Democratic Party. But these Democratic Senate wins were enabled by Georgia's idiosyncratic Senate elections, which require runoff elections if no candidate receives over 50% of the vote. In the first round of the class II Georgia Senate election, held on November 3, 2020, Republican candidate David Perdue edged out Democratic candidate Jon Ossoff with 49.73% of the vote to Ossoff's 47.95%. In every other state, Perdue would have been declared the winner, but because of Georgia's unique election laws the race proceeded to a runoff election (all candidates except for the top two—Perdue and Ossoff—were eliminated from the ballot). Held nearly two months later on January 5, 2021, Ossoff narrowly defeated Perdue, receiving 50.61% of the vote. In the Senate special election, which featured no primary elections and thus had multiple candidates from each party on the ballot, Democratic candidate Raphael Warnock, who received 32.90% of the vote, and Republican candidate Kelly Loeffler, who received 25.91% of the vote, proceeded to the runoff election, which Warnock narrowly won with 51.04% of the vote.)—and includes a provision removing the secretary of state from the Board of Elections, a measure seemingly targeted at Brad Raffensperger, the Republican secretary of state who oversaw the 2020 election in Georgia and famously rebuffed attempts by Donald Trump and state lawmakers to overturn Georgia's election results. (Note: Republicans are also looking to oust Raffensperger from his position as secretary of state in the next election, with former president Donald Trump endorsing Raffensperger's primary challenger Jody Hice, a vocal proponent of the lie that the 2020 election was stolen from Donald Trump. They had also earlier targeted him during then-President Donald Trump's attempt to overturn the 2020 election, with a number of state Republicans and both Republican senators from Georgia calling on Raffensperger to resign. A Republican strategist in Georgia has commented, "[Raffensperger's] toast...I don't know that there's a single elected official who would put their neck out for Brad Raffensperger right now.") Providing justification for itself, a preamble to the bill declares that "many electors [are] concerned about allegations of rampant voter fraud"—despite no evidence of meaningful levels of fraud.

The bill quickly drew a number of legal challenges, with groups challenging the law including the American Civil Liberties Union (ACLU), the NAACP Legal Defense and Educational Fund, the Southern Poverty Law Center, the League of Women Voters of Georgia, the New Georgia Project, Black Voters Matter, the Sixth District of the African Methodist Episcopal Church, the Lower Muskogee Creek Tribe, the Georgia Muslim Voter Project, Women Watch Afrika, the Latino Community Fund Georgia, and Delta Sigma Theta sorority. They argue that the bill violates the 14th Amendment to the United States Constitution and Section Two of the Voting Rights Act of 1965, which forbids racially discriminatory voting rules. The Georgia NAACP further alleges that Republican officials are purposefully attempting to discriminate against black Georgians "in order to maintain the tenuous hold the Republican Party has in Georgia" (Democratic wins in the state in 2020—especially the two Senate races—were fueled by high black turnout).

The bill also drew condemnation from a number of companies, including Georgia-based Delta Air Lines and The Coca-Cola Company. Georgia House Republicans retaliated against Delta by passing a bill ending a tax break on jet fuel (it failed to advance in the state Senate). Commenting on the bill, state House Speaker David Ralston quipped, "You don't feed a dog that bites your hand". Additionally, Major League Baseball announced plans to move the 2021 All-Star game out of Atlanta in protest of the law. Former president Donald Trump, who was the central promoter of false claims of widespread election fraud and the principal agent in the attempt to overturn the 2020 presidential election, called on Republicans and conservatives to boycott Major League Baseball, Coca-Cola, and Delta Air Lines, as well as a host of other companies that condemned the bill.

Republican lieutenant governor Geoff Duncan said during an April 2021 CNN interview that momentum for the legislation grew from "the fallout from the ten weeks of misinformation that flew in from former president Donald Trump. I went back over the weekend to really look at where this really started to gain momentum in the legislature, and it was when Rudy Giuliani showed up in a couple of committee rooms and spent hours spreading misinformation and sowing doubt across, you know, hours of testimony."

=== Idaho ===
Republicans in Idaho have introduced bills that would make ballot collection a felony, bar absentee ballots for presidential elections except for active-duty members of the military, limit which forms of photo ID can be used to vote (e.g. student IDs would no longer be accepted), and make it more challenging to qualify voter initiatives for the Idaho ballot. While defending recent Republican voting proposals in the state, Representative Mike Moyle stated, "You know what? Voting shouldn't be easy".

The first bill to advance was the ballot collection bill (HB 88, introduced by Mike Moyle), which has been amended to be less restrictive. Moyle has justified his bill by pointing to false claims of widespread voter fraud in the 2020 presidential election.

=== Indiana ===
A Republican-authored bill that would have required individuals applying to vote by mail to provide their driver's license numbers or the last four digits of their Social Security numbers. The bill was not reported out of committee in 2021.

=== Iowa ===
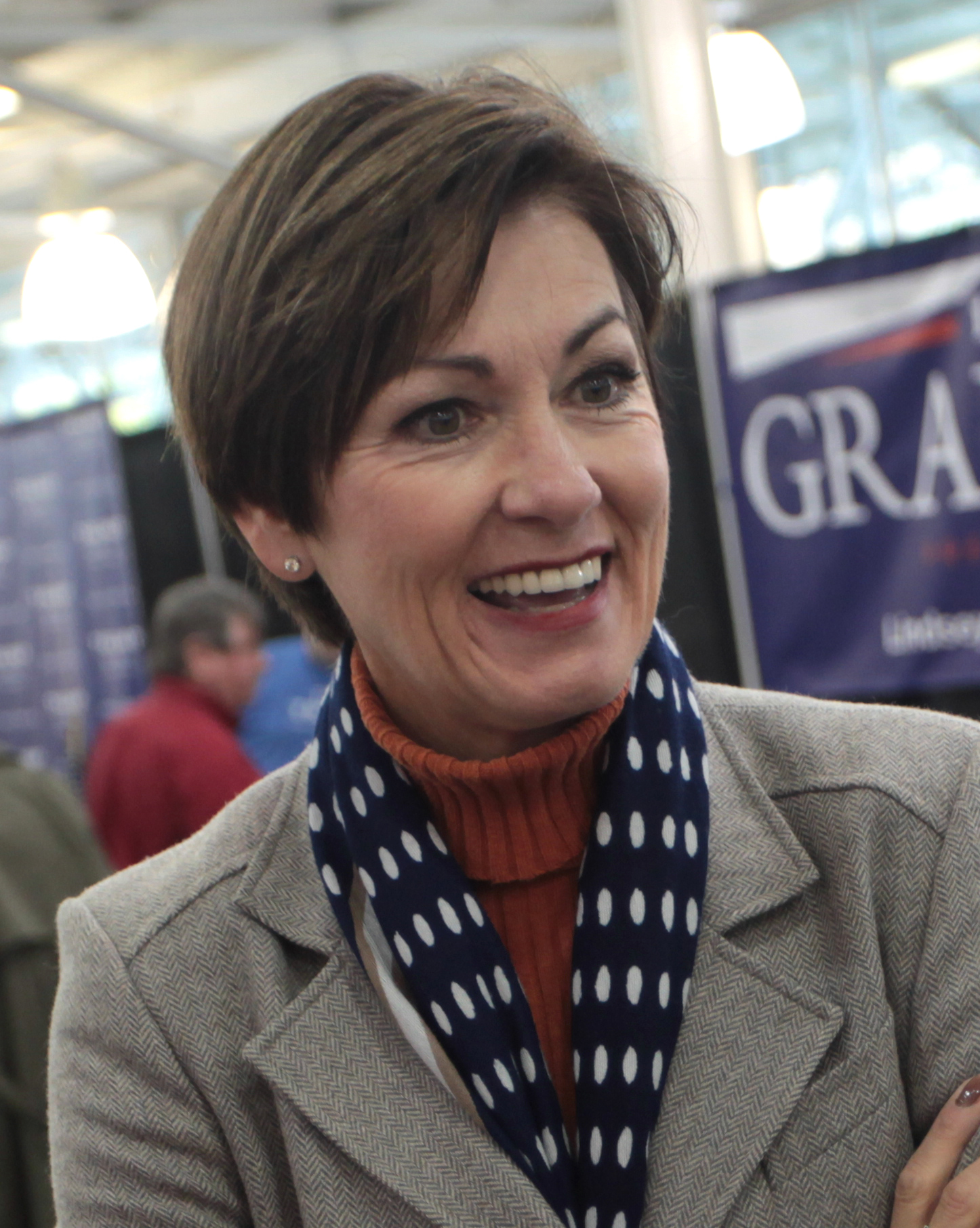
Iowa governor Kim Reynolds (R) signed into law the first bill restricting the vote following the 2020 presidential election.

On March 8, 2021, Iowa governor Kim Reynolds signed into law a Republican-backed bill reducing early voting by 9 days, (Note: This follows a 2018 bill backed by Republicans that shortened early voting by 11 days.) requiring most mail-in ballots to be received by Election Day, (Note: Previously, ballots postmarked by Election Day (i.e. they had been turned into the Post Office by Election Day) could be received up to one week after Election Day.) banning county election officials from sending out absentee ballot request forms unless requested, (Note: In some areas, absentee ballot request forms are automatically sent out to all voters.) and shortening Election Day voting by one hour. Republicans claim the bill is necessary to defend against voter fraud, despite no history of meaningful levels of fraud in the state. During debate over the bill, Republican state senator Jim Carlin stated that "Most of us in my caucus and the Republican caucus believe the 2020 presidential election was stolen".

An earlier proposed bill would have required mail-in ballots to be turned into the US Post Office ten days before Election Day.

=== Kansas ===
Shortly after the inauguration of Joe Biden, Republicans in the state began rolling out a number of voting reform proposals. Among them, one would make it a felony for anyone besides a family member or caregiver to return another person's absentee ballot; one would disallow the Kansas Secretary of State from extending the deadline absentee ballots postmarked by Election Day must be received by the state, (Note: The deadline is three days after Election Day.) which critics worry could disenfranchise voters if the US Postal Service were to experience delays; and one would call on Congress to oppose H.R. 1, a voting rights bill.

In late March, the state Senate approved a number of measures that would, according to the Kansas City Star, "give the Legislature virtually complete control of elections" by stripping the governor, the secretary of state, and the courts of their ability to regulate elections. Another bill passed would limit ballot collection by churches, civic groups, neighbors and candidates; Republicans cited the example of former Democratic state Representative Tim Hodge, who won his 2018 election by only 88 votes—some of them picked up and returned by his campaign—as reason to end ballot collection. The ballot collection bill was opposed by the NAACP, the ACLU, and the Disability Rights Center of Kansas.

HB2183 and HB332 were both passed and went into effect on July 1, 2021. HB2183 made an expanded definition of impersonation of an election official a felony. The District Attorney of Douglas County, Kansas said the provisions were too vague and that she would not enforce them. However, Kansas attorney general Derek Schmidt promised to do so, causing the non-partisan organizations League of Women Voters of Kansas and Loud Light to halt voter registration drives, including those on college campuses at the beginning of the school year.

The state is also being sued by the American Civil Liberties Union for $4 million worth of legal fees after the organization's successful five-year legal effort to overturn a Kansas law that required potential voters to prove their citizenship when registering to vote, which blocked the registrations of more than 35,000 eligible Kansas voters.

=== Kentucky ===
Republicans in Kentucky have largely bucked the trend of state Republicans advancing partisan bills that would make voting laws more restrictive, instead backing a bipartisan bill that would make certain policies implemented during the COVID-19 pandemic to ensure voter access permanent, including a short period of early voting (prior to the pandemic, Kentucky was one of only a few states not to offer early voting) and allowing voters to fix errors made on mail-in ballots. This distinction was made explicit by the Republican Secretary of State, who told lawmakers, "In many other states right now, legislatures are debating restricting access of their voters to the ballot. Not here in Kentucky. What you all are debating today, and hopefully considering, is actually making it easier for our voters to vote". The bill does also include certain election security provisions popular with Republicans nationwide, including a ban on ballot collection and rules making it easier to remove people who have moved out of Kentucky from the state's voter rolls, but the bill is generally considered to expand voting access rather than restrict it. The bill passed the Kentucky House of Representatives 93–4 in late February.

=== Mississippi ===
In 2023, State Representative Brent Powell introduced House Bill 1310 for debate in the Mississippi House of Representatives which would provide notice to voters who had not cast any ballot within a period including two federal elections. If, after four subsequent years, notice recipients had not responded, voted in any election, responded to jury duty, or been active or reserve military personnel, they would be removed from voting rolls.

=== Montana ===
In March 2020, in a party-line vote the Montana House passed a bill that would end same-day voter registration, which has been offered in the state since 2005, and instead require voters to register by noon on the Monday before Election Day. Supporters say it would ease the workload of election officials on Election Day, while critics say it would unnecessarily eliminate an effective voting measure and may disproportionately impact Native Americans living on tribal reservations, who often face long travel times to polling locations.

Another proposed bill would make Montana's voter ID laws more stringent, requiring voters to present a second form of identification when using certain forms of photo identification that are currently accepted, like student IDs. Opponents say the bill could disenfranchise otherwise eligible voters, including college students and disabled or elderly people who don't drive, and would disproportionately affect Native Americans, who are more likely to lack photo ID and often have non-traditional addresses.

Some Republicans are backing a bill introduced by Democratic representative Sharon Stewart-Peregoy that would make voting easier for Native Americans by requiring at least two satellite elections offices on every reservation and allow tribal citizens to vote using a non-traditional address on their reservation.

=== Nevada ===
Republicans in Nevada have proposed a bill (AB 163) that would require voters to provide proof of identity at the polls and require absentee ballots to be received by 7 p.m. on Election Day (under existing law, as long as ballots are turned into the Post Office by Election Day they are accepted up to a few days after Election Day).[185] It also includes a provision requiring the Nevada Secretary of State to crosscheck the names of dead Nevadans with voter registration lists at least once a month, likely prompted by former President Donald Trump's false claims that over 1,500 deceased people voted in Nevada in the 2020 presidential election.[185] Nevada was one of six states targeted by Trump and his Republican allies in their attempt to overturn the 2020 presidential election. However, with Democrats in charge of both chambers of the legislature, Republican election bills have almost no chance of passing.

=== New Hampshire ===
With more students per capita than any other state (fully 12% of the state's overall population are university students), Republican efforts have focused on student voting. (Note: Students tend to be a liberal-leaning coalition.) As reported by Abigail Weinberg in Mother Jones:

After Republicans took control of the state's legislature in 2020, House lawmakers introduced three bills restricting student voting: HB 554, HB 362, and HB 429. HB 554 prevents people from voting in New Hampshire if they maintained a domicile address in another state; HB 362 forbids students from registering to vote at their college address; and HB 429 prohibits the use of a college ID as a voter ID.

As of February 8, 2021, at least seven other bills that would restrict voting access have been introduced. Another bill would end the winner-take-all system for New Hampshire's electoral votes in the Electoral College, replacing it with a district system similar to Maine's. (Note: In New Hampshire, the Democratic candidate for president tends to win the statewide popular vote, collecting all four of the state's electoral votes. Had New Hampshire had a district system in 2016, as Republicans now want, Donald Trump would have been awarded one of the state's electoral votes, rather than none.)

On July 30, 2021, Governor Chris Sununu signed SB 89, which rejects the For the People Act. In case the latter becomes a law, it will not apply to the local elections in New Hampshire.

=== Oklahoma ===
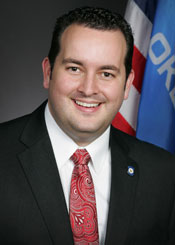
Oklahoma Rep. Sean Roberts (R) introduced a bill that would have required every registered voter in Oklahoma to re-register before the next general election.

In February 2021, Republican state representative Sean Roberts introduced two election-related bills, one that would prohibit the use of electronic voting machines and another that would require all registered Oklahoma voters to re-register before the next general election. Another bill would call for an amendment to the U.S. Constitution that would prohibit absentee ballots from being mailed to voters unless their absentee ballot application had been notarized or signed by two witnesses.

In November 2020, shortly after the 2020 presidential election, two Republican Senators introduced a bill that would "call on the legislatures of each state that did not report results on Election Day to use their power to audit and recount their election results" and another that would require the Oklahoma state legislature to select the state's electors for the Electoral College—rather than have the state's electors determined by the statewide popular vote—unless Congress were to pass an election integrity bill.

=== Texas ===
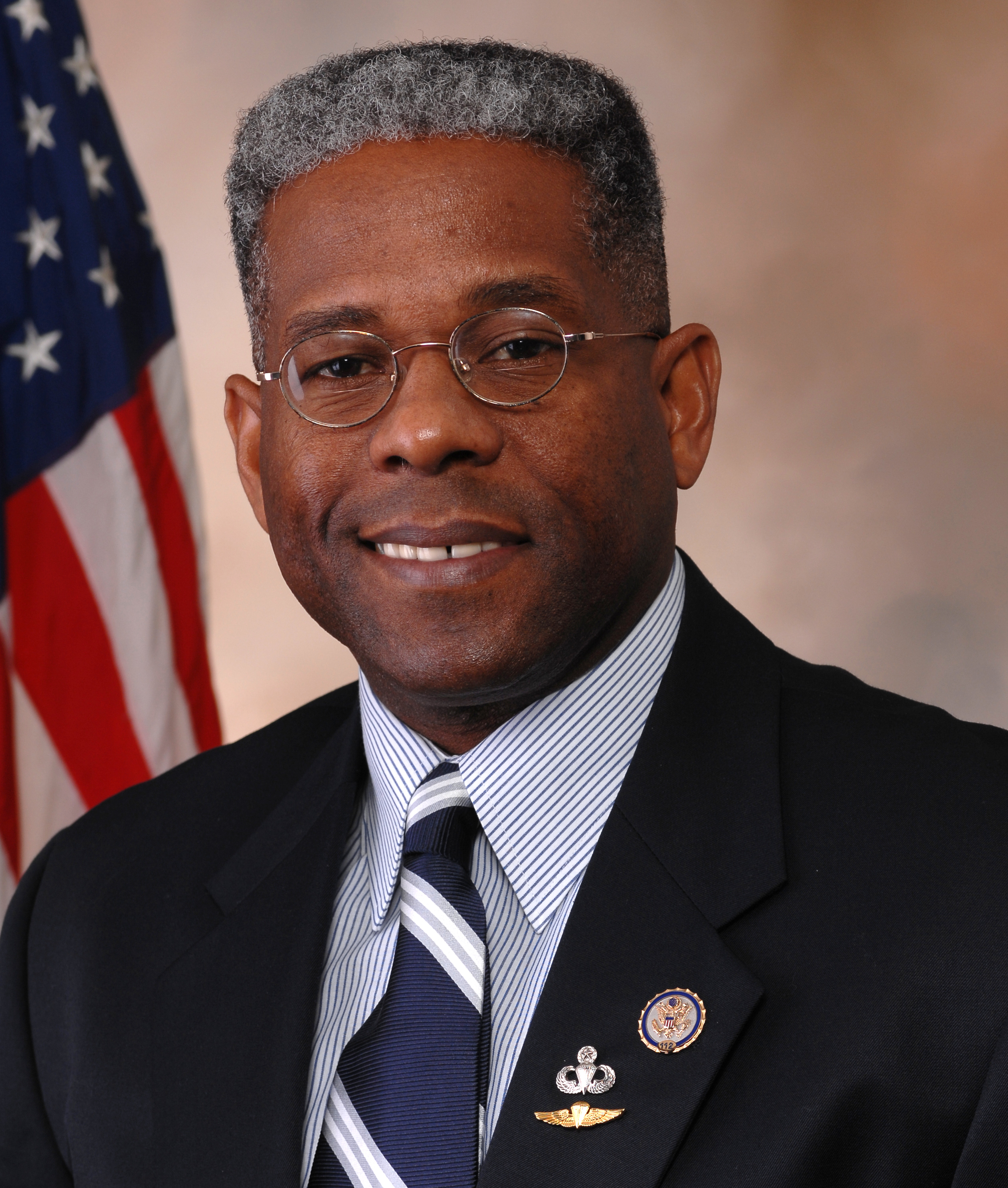
Allen West, the chairman of the Texas Republican Party, has said "election integrity" is among the party's highest priorities following the 2020 election. He previously faced controversy over a December 2020 comment in which he seemingly suggested secession from the United States (Note: West stated, "Perhaps law-abiding states should bond together and form a Union of states that will abide by the Constitution.") after the Supreme Court rejected Texas' attempt to invalidate election results from four states.

According to the Texas Tribune, "Republicans are staging a sweeping legislative campaign to further tighten the state's already restrictive voting rules and raise new barriers for some voters, clamping down in particular on local efforts to make voting easier". State GOP chairman Allen West has declared that "election integrity" would be a top priority in the 2021 legislative session, a sentiment that was affirmed by Republican governor Greg Abbott, who proclaimed "election security" to be an emergency legislative item. Bills proposed would ban drive-thru voting and reduce early voting hours, (Note: In Harris County, more than half of the votes cast at drive-through sites and during extended hours were cast by black or Hispanic voters.) restrict the number of voting machines allowed at polling centers, and prohibit local election officials from sending out mail-in ballot applications to all voters. Republicans are placing special emphasis on targeting procedures that were used in Harris County, a heavily Democratic county that includes Houston, Texas, which offered more expansive voting options like drive-through voting (Note: The targeting of drive-thru voting in Harris County extended to such lengths that during the 2020 presidential election a number of Republicans sued to have over 100,000 ballots cast in drive-through voting centers in Harris County tossed out.) and longer hours at polling locations.

By February 1, 2021, eight bills that would reduce voting access had been introduced, including House Bill 25 and Senate Bill 208, which would limit who can send absentee ballot applications to voters without an affirmative request; House Bill 1924 and House Bill 335, which would expedite removal of deceased persons, the mentally incapacitated, and those charged with felonies from voter rolls; House Bill 61, which would tighten signature requirements on absentee ballot requests; House Bill 329, which would require the Texas secretary of state to cross-reference its voter registry with the U.S. Department of Homeland Security's non-citizen resident database at least twice a year; and House Bill 895, which would allow election officials to photograph the faces of voters if the officials question the authenticity of the documentation presented by the voters.

In March 2021, Texas Republicans rolled out a slate of "restrictive election bills". Among the over two dozen proposals are initiatives to make voter ID laws more stringent, cut early voting hours in urban areas, restrict drive-through voting, ban the sending of absentee ballots to PO boxes, and increase criminal penalties for fraud or mistakes made by voters or officials. (Note: Under existing law, voter fraud in Texas is a felony punishable by between 180 days and two years in state jail.)

By late March, Republican efforts had consolidated around two election bills: House Bill 6 (HB6), introduced by Rep. Briscoe Cain (who had previously volunteered with the Trump campaign in Pennsylvania as it attempted to overturn the outcome of the presidential election), and Senate Bill 7 (SB7), introduced by Sen. Bryan Hughes et al. HB6 would ban drive-through voting, make it a felony for local election officials to send unsolicited absentee ballot request forms, require counties to provide the same number of voting machines in each polling location regardless of population density, and tighten the state's already strict absentee ballot qualifications (only the elderly, people with disabilities, and those who will be away from home can vote by mail) by requiring voters with disabilities to provide proof that they are incapable of voting in person (which critics argue amounts to a poll tax, since it would require disabled people who are unable to vote in person to pay for a doctors visit). SB7 would similarly limit drive-through voting, prohibit sending unsolicited absentee ballot request forms, and require disabled voters to provide proof they are unable to vote in person, and would also limit voting hours from 7 A.M. to 7 P.M.—a "direct response to Harris County having voting centers open until 10 P.M". On April 1, 2021, the state Senate passed SB7, amended to allow voting hours from 6 a.m. to 9 p.m.

Republicans argue these bills are necessary to prevent voter fraud, despite fraud being nearly nonexistent in the state. (Note: Texas attorney general Ken Paxton, a major proponent of discredited claims of widespread voter fraud in the 2020 presidential election, devoted more than 22,000 staff hours to investigating voter fraud in the 2020 presidential election and found only 16 minor cases of voter fraud out of the more than 11 million votes cast.) State Sen. Paul Bettencourt, a cosponsor of SB 7, has defended Republican election bills by saying "The November 2020 election demonstrated the lack of transparency and lack of integrity within the election process", drawing on claims from the months-long effort by Republican officials to de-legitimize the 2020 election. Critics, including former House Representative Beto O'Rourke, have decried the efforts as "voter suppression". The Texas Democratic Party called the bills an "assault on voting rights". On July 12, 2021, at least 59 Democratic lawmakers left the state to prevent Republicans from having quorum to act on their legislation.

A new bill, SB 1, was passed into law on September 7, 2021. The law expands the voting hours as proposed in the earlier SB7, but critics stated this reduced voting hours in the state's most populous areas. The law also bans drive-thru and overnight early voting, and introduced identification requirements for absentee voting. Multiple groups challenged the law on the day it was passed. The U.S. Department of Justice also filed suit against the state in November 2021, asserting the law's change to accessibility at voting places and absentee ballots violates the Voting Rights Act. The DOJ also joined some of the other suits challenging SB1.

=== Utah ===
On February 15, 2021, Utah governor Spencer Cox signed into law House Bill 12, which the Brennan Center for Justice claims will "make faulty [voter] purges more likely". Specifically, the Brennan Center explains that:

The bill requires county clerks to cross-reference all death certificates against voter registration rolls and remove the names of dead voters within 10 days. Because the law does not require any notice to the voters being removed, does not require auditing of the source data, and does not specify how many data points must be matched, it creates a risk that county clerks will remove the wrong names from their voter registration rolls.

=== Wyoming ===
On February 8, 2021, the Wyoming Republican Party published a resolution calling for a significant tightening of the state's election laws, including a ban on mail-in voting, curbside voting, and ballot drop boxes, strict limits on who qualifies for absentee voting (currently, the state has does not require an excuse to vote absentee), a requirement that people register to vote in person rather than on the internet or by mail, and a prohibition of electronic voting machines. According to the Casper Star-Tribune, the resolution "parrot[s] numerous concerns pushed by former President Donald Trump, who claimed numerous instances of voter fraud in several states he lost despite providing no evidence to support those claims". The state party has also called H.R. 1, a federal voting rights and campaign finance reform bill, a "federal invasion" of states' rights.

On April 6, 2021, Republican lawmakers passed HB0075, which requires residents to present an ID to vote (previously, voters had to present an ID when registering to vote, but not when voting). Supporters say the bill is necessary to prevent voter fraud, despite no evidence of significant levels of fraud in the state (there have been only four convictions for voter fraud in the state over the past several decades).

== State bills ==
=== Alaska ===
The first bill to be heard in the 2021 session of the Alaska legislature was Senate Bill 39 , which would "partially dismantle voting-by-mail systems used by Anchorage, Juneau and other cities across the state", according to the Associated Press, by prohibiting cities and boroughs from automatically sending ballots to registered voters. Supporters say it would strengthen the security of the state's election system, while opponents have called it an attempt at voter suppression.

=== Colorado ===
Republicans in Colorado have introduced five election-related bills since the 2020 presidential election. The bills would repeal automatic mail ballots, require an annual audit of voter rolls, allow any voter to request a recount, require proof of citizenship to register to vote, and not count ballots received after Election Day, even if they are postmarked by Election Day. With Democrats in control of both chambers of the Colorado legislature, the bills are not expected to pass.

=== Connecticut ===
The Republican minority in the Connecticut General Assembly is opposing two elections-related constitutional amendments Democratic lawmakers hope to put on the ballot in 2022 (changes to voting law in Connecticut require amending the state constitution): one that would allow no-excuse absentee voting and another that would allow early voting. Republican lawmakers have also proposed bills that would end same-day voter registration and make signature verification of absentee ballots stricter.

=== Maryland ===
On February 4, 2021, Maryland Republicans introduced a slate voting proposals, including bills that would require photo identification to vote, restrict ballot collection, and strengthen signature verification on absentee ballots.

=== Michigan ===
On March 24, 2021, Michigan Republicans introduced a package of 39 election reform bills that would introduce new restrictions to voting access, targeting in particular forms of voting that were the focus of former president Donald Trump's attempts to overturn the 2020 United States presidential election (which focused heavily on Michigan and five other six swing states). The bills would limit the availability of ballot drop boxes, require photo ID when applying for an absentee ballot, prohibit absentee ballot applications from being made available online, bar the secretary of state from sending out absentee ballot applications unless specifically requested by the voter, (Note: In the 2020 presidential election, amid the COVID-19 pandemic, the Democratic Secretary of State Jocelyn Benson sent out absentee ballot applications to all registered voters, drawing rebukes from Republicans, including then-President Donald Trump.) and ban clerks from supplying prepaid return postage for absentee ballots. Another bill would allow election challengers and poll watchers to videotape the tabulating of votes after Trump and his supporters made poll watching in Detroit a centerpiece of their effort to discredit 2020 election results in Michigan. The bills also contain two provisions that would expand ballot access: one that would require local clerks to open for early voting on the second Saturday before an election and another that would pre-register 16 and 17-year-olds who get their drivers license.

Senate Majority Leader Mike Shirkey (R) said the bills are intended to make it easier to vote and harder to cheat while State Sen. Erika Geiss (D) said the bills "put lipstick on Jim Crow". The Senate Minority Leader Jim Ananich (D) argued that the bills emanate from Republican attempts to overturn the 2020 presidential election, saying "No one should be fooled: This is nothing more than an extension of lies and deceit about the last election. We cannot and should not make policy based on the Big Lie". (Note: The "Big Lie", a term that describes a gross misrepresentation of facts used for political purposes, is often used to refer to the false notion pushed by Donald Trump and his Republican allies that the 2020 presidential election was rigged in favor of Joe Biden.)

The bills are unlikely to become law (with the exception of several inoffensive measures that may draw bipartisan support) in the current legislative session as the state's Democratic governor would almost certainly veto them. However, Republican leaders in the state have developed a plan to subvert the governor's veto power by using a statute that allows the legislature to avoid a governor's veto if enough signatures (in this legislative session, more than 340,000 would be needed) are collected.

=== Minnesota ===
Republicans in Minnesota are focusing on efforts to limit the number of people who can vote by mail and to require photo identification to vote. (Note: In 2012, a ballot initiative to amend the state constitution to require photo ID to vote was rejected by voters.) Owing to the COVID-19 pandemic, Minnesota introduced no-excuse mail-in voting, enabling a record 58% of Minnesota to vote by mail; several Republican proposals would revert Minnesota to its pre-pandemic system, which required voters to have a valid excuse to qualify for absentee voting.

The Democratic secretary of state Steve Simon criticized the voter ID bill as unnecessary, saying voter fraud in Minnesota is "minuscule" and that the ID requirement could disenfranchise "hundreds of thousands of eligible voters", particularly older people. Republican-backed bills introduced in the state Senate, where Republicans have a majority, are unlikely to become law, owing to opposition in the Democratic-controlled state House of Representatives and a Democratic governor.

=== Mississippi ===
On February 12, 2021, the Mississippi Senate passed Senate Bill 2588 in a party-line vote. The bill allows for quicker purging of names from voter rolls and requires county election commissioners to remove the name of any person who does not vote at least once during a four-year period and fails to respond to a mail notice. (Note: This tightens existing law, which only allows a voter's name to be removed from the rolls if they've died, moved, been judged mentally incompetent or been convicted of a disenfranchising crime.) Estimates for the number of people who would receive notices, which if not responded to would result in removal from the voter roll, range from 250,000 to 600,000.

State Republicans argue the bill would prevent voter fraud. Opponents note that there is no evidence of widespread voter fraud in Mississippi and argue that the bill amounts to voter suppression. The Mississippi branch of the American Civil Liberties Union (ACLU) has called the bill a "serious attempt at voter suppression". Democratic state lawmakers have derided the bill, with state senator David Lee Jordan arguing that the bill could disenfranchise Black Mississippians and state senator Hob Bryan saying "For tens of thousands of people in Mississippi, eligible voters who haven't done a thing in the world except choose not to vote in every single election and didn't get a postcard, or whatever the thing is, they are going to be denied their right to vote by the tens of thousands". A senior staff attorney for the Southern Poverty Law Center Action Fund has argued that the bill violates the National Voter Registration Act of 1993, which prevents voters from being removed from registration rolls for unnecessary or discriminatory reasons.

Other bills introduced include HB 543, which would prohibit driver's licenses from states other than Mississippi from being used as photo identification for the purposes of voting, and MS SB 2254, which would require people attempting to register to vote to present a birth certificate, passport, naturalization document, or other method of proof of citizenship established by the federal Immigration Reform and Control Act of 1986.

=== Missouri ===
In Missouri, which has voting laws that are among the strictest in the country, at least 9 bills that would restrict voting access have been introduced. The largest effort is to restore voter ID provisions that were struck down by the Missouri Supreme Court in 2020 as unconstitutional. Such a photo ID bill was passed by the Missouri House of Representatives on February 24, 2021.

Republican state lawmakers are also advancing a bill that would make it harder for voters to amend the state constitution through ballot initiatives, raising the share of votes needed from a simple majority to a two-thirds supermajority. (Note: In recent years, ballot initiatives have been used to pass policies opposed by the Republican majority in the state legislature, including an expansion of Medicaid and marijuana legalization.)

=== Nebraska ===
A bill introduced by Republican state senator Julie Slama (LR3CA) would require photo identification to vote. Slama also proposed a second bill (LB76) that would revert the state to a winner-take-all system in the Electoral College. (Note: In Nebraska, the statewide popular vote is almost always won by the Republican presidential candidate. Under the winner-take-all system common to nearly all other states, this would give the Republican candidate all five of the state's electoral votes. However, under the state's district system, one electoral vote was awarded to Democratic candidate Barack Obama in 2008 and one to Democratic candidate Joe Biden in 2020.)

=== North Carolina ===
In March 2021, several Republican lawmakers introduced Senate Bill 326, also known as the "Election Integrity Act", which would reduce the amount of time voters have to turn in absentee ballot requests by one week, require absentee ballots to be received by 5pm on Election Day (existing law allows ballots that are turned into the Post Office by Election Day to be received by county officials up to three days after Election Day), and prohibit county boards of election and the state board of election from accepting private donations to administer elections. It would also set aside $5 million from the state's General Fund to help those without a photo ID obtain one (North Carolina requires a photo ID to vote). Several Democrats have registered their opposition to the bill, with State Senator Don Davis (D) saying "I believe that we should make [voting] easier. If that ballot is cast by Election Day, then that ballot should be counted."

=== North Dakota ===
Republicans have introduced a number of bills that would tighten election laws. House Bill 1289 would lengthen residency requirements, House Bill 1312 would place additional restrictions on who can vote absentee, and House Bill 1397 would adjust the congressional redistricting process. Senate Bill 2271, introduced by Republican senator Robert Erbele and passed 43-3 (Republicans hold a 40-vote majority in the Senate), would withhold the state's vote count from the public until after votes in the Electoral College have been cast; the measure is intended to prevent the implementation of the National Popular Vote Interstate Compact, a multi-state agreement to implement a national popular vote for the election of the president. (Note: The National Popular Vote Interstate Compact (NPVIC) makes clever use of the rules of the Electoral College to implement a national popular vote without actually abolishing the Electoral College, which would require a constitutional amendment. Under the agreement, once states collectively having over 270 electoral votes (a majority in the Electoral College) sign on to the NPVIC, they agree to award all of their electoral votes to the winner of the national popular vote, thereby guaranteeing that the winner of the popular vote receives a majority of votes in the Electoral College. Senate Bill 2271 would thwart the NPVIC by preventing North Dakota's vote totals from being added to the national vote count, making it impossible to determine the national popular vote.)

=== Pennsylvania ===
In Pennsylvania, at least 8 laws that would restrict voting access have been introduced. A central focus of Republicans in the state in 2021 has been eliminating no-excuse absentee voting, which was enacted in 2020 in a bipartisan vote. Bills tightening voting laws are not expected to pass in Pennsylvania, as the state's Democratic governor has stated he is "opposed to any efforts to disenfranchise voters".

=== South Carolina ===
Republicans in South Carolina are advancing a bill that would make it harder for voters to meet witness requirements for absentee ballots. Another bill (H.3444) would tilt the partisan balance of the State Election Commission towards the Republican Party (shifting it from a 4–4 split to 6–3 in favor of Republicans) while simultaneously granting the commission greater power to regulate election procedures.

=== South Dakota ===
Republicans in South Dakota are pushing a series of bills that would make election laws more stringent, including one (passed by the state House) that would bar the secretary of state from sending out applications for absentee voting and another that would increase scrutiny of ballot initiatives. Republicans say the bills are needed to prevent fraud that Donald Trump falsely claimed affected the 2020 presidential election, while state Democrats say they are worried Republicans are using falsehoods to clamp down on voting access.

=== Tennessee ===
Republican bills to restrict voting access include one introduced by Republican state senator Janice Bowling, which would abolish early voting, end the use of voting machines, and require watermarked paper ballots hand-marked by voters (it was later withdrawn); one that would require voters to provide a fingerprint to vote; and another that would mandate the names of people who request absentee ballots to be posted to the county election commission website. The Republican-dominated state House is also moving forward with a bill that would remove the judge who approved an expansion of absentee voting in the 2020 presidential election, sparking concerns of an "unprecedented breach of judicial independence".

=== Washington ===
Two bills introduced by a number of Republican state lawmakers (Senate Bill 5143, House Bill 1377) would limit or eliminate all-mail voting, which has existed in Washington since 2012. The bills cite false claims that there were "credible allegations of voter fraud, ballot tampering, and foreign interference" in the 2020 election as justification for the overhaul of the state's election system. Another bill would require photo identification to vote by mail.

=== Wisconsin ===
In Wisconsin, Republicans are supporting a series of bills intended to limit absentee voting (some are also backing bipartisan election reforms that would institute ranked choice voting and open primaries). The measures on absentee voting were introduced by two Republican state senators on February 24, 2021, as a package of 10 bills. Important provisions include those that would require absentee voters to provide an ID for every election and limit who can automatically receive absentee ballots. The bills also include new regulations on ballot boxes, bar election officials from adding missing information (like an address) to a voter's absentee ballot envelope (even if they have access to official government documents that provide the missing information), restrict ballot collection to immediate family members, and prohibit people who work for political advocacy groups from serving as poll workers.

Responding to a political controversy over indefinitely confined voters (voters who have a medical condition) in the 2020 presidential election, (Note: Differences in how counties approved claims of indefinitely confined status in the 2020 election led to lawsuits by Republicans seeking to have mail-in votes in predominately Democratic cities thrown out for not meeting the criteria for indefinitely confined status. In December, the Wisconsin Supreme Court ruled unanimously that the votes were valid and that, under existing law, it is up to each voter to decide whether they qualify as indefinitely confined. Now, Republicans want to tighten the rules regarding who qualifies as indefinitely confined.) the lawmakers included a significant number of provisions related to indefinitely confined voters, including:

- Eliminating the voter ID exemption for indefinitely confined voters
- Requiring indefinitely confined voters to affirm they are medically afflicted under oath
- Requiring indefinitely confined voters who are over 65 to provide documentation from a health care provider
- Clarifying that a pandemic or other outbreak of a communicable disease does not qualify voters as indefinitely confined
- Removing anyone who qualified for indefinitely confined status between March 12 and November 6, 2020, from the list of indefinitely confined individuals
- Making it a felony, punishable by up to $10,000 or imprisonment for up to three and a half years, for falsely declaring oneself indefinitely confined.

One of the Republican lawmakers who introduced the bills says they are necessary because "far too many people have sincere concerns about our electoral system...These bills will help restore trust and make sure our elections are handled fairly for everyone." Wisconsin Democrats have meanwhile labelled them an "attack on voter rights", with the three Democratic members on the Assembly Elections Committee going so far as to say they are a "full-on assault on our elections and the ability for Wisconsinites to vote". Republican leaders in the state say the measures represent a legislative priority for them and intend to move forward with the bills, even though Democratic governor Tony Evers is unlikely to sign them into law (according to the Associated Press, the measures are intended to show "what [Republicans] may try to enact if a Republican is elected governor in 2022.").

== Ballot initiative restrictions ==
The New York Times reported in May 2021 that so far that year, Republicans had introduced 144 bills to restrict ballot initiatives in 32 states, 19 of which had been signed into law by nine Republican governors. Although ballot initiatives had historically been used by both parties, Democrats had been especially successful using the process in recent years in states where they do not control the state government. In three states, Republican legislators asked voters to approve ballot initiatives that would restrict their right to bring and pass future ballot initiatives.

== Fundraising ==
Following the 2020 presidential election, conservative political organizations began a major fundraising effort to advance Republican voting restriction efforts. The Republican National Committee (RNC) created an "election integrity" committee consisting of 24 members, many of whom were "deeply involved" in the Stop the Steal effort to overturn the 2020 presidential election, to develop election law proposals. Heritage Action, the lobbying arm of The Heritage Foundation, announced a $24 million effort to back Republican efforts to amend state voting laws, including a $700,000 ad campaign in Georgia; internal documents indicate that Heritage plans to coordinate with the American Legislative Exchange Council (ALEC) and the State Policy Network. The anti-abortion group Susan B. Anthony List (Note: Anti-abortion activists have expressed concern that anti-abortion candidates would struggle to be elected without measures to restrict the vote, or at least measures to prevent efforts to expand it. Ken Cuccinelli, the chair of the Election Integrity Initiative, for instance, has argued that "The pro-life movement must engage in election transparency and integrity reform, or their ability to elect pro-life, pro-family lawmakers – and pass laws that save lives – will be greatly diminished, if not extinguished." According to The New York Times, many donors to anti-abortion organizations have also expressed a lack of enthusiasm to continue providing donations out of a false belief that Democrats rig elections, prompting anti-abortion groups to direct money towards "election integrity".) and the American Principles Project partnered together to create the Election Transparency Initiative, which started with $5 million in funding. FreedomWorks has dedicated $10 million to Republican efforts to tighten voting laws. Kelly Loeffler, after being unseated by Democratic candidate Raphael Warnock in the 2020–21 United States Senate special election in Georgia, launched Greater Georgia, an effort to promote Republican electoral policies in Georgia, as well as register likely conservative voters; Loeffler (whose net worth is estimated at over $800 million) has personally invested at least $1 million in the organization.

Relatedly, in January 2021 CNBC revealed that the dark money organization Donors Trust had funneled millions of dollars toward conservative organizations that pushed claims of election fraud in the 2020 election. A report by Public Citizen revealed that a variety of corporations, including AT&T, Comcast, Philip Morris USA, UnitedHealth Group, Walmart, Verizon Wireless, General Motors, and Pfizer, had in recent years donated over $50 million to politicians who have proposed voting restrictions or voted in favor of them.

== Reactions ==
A statement signed by over 300 companies, executives, and celebrities opposing voting rights restriction efforts

Some major corporations voiced opposition to Georgia's Election Integrity Act and faced backlash from Republican politicians, including calls to boycott the companies. On April 10, 2021, more than 100 corporate CEOs and leaders gathered online to discuss options in response to the new laws; the options included halting donations to politicians who support the laws and suspending investments in states that enact them. On April 14, 2021, a letter published in The New York Times, The Washington Post and The Wall Street Journal, among other outlets, and signed by over 300 companies, executives, and celebrities, stated they "stand for democracy" and opposed the voting restrictions. A coalition of sixty major law firms said it would "challenge any election law that would impose unnecessary barriers on the right to vote and that would disenfranchise underrepresented groups in our country," according to the group's organizer.

Republicans have opposed corporate efforts against their voting laws, with Mitch McConnell calling on corporations to "stay out of politics" and that it "will invite serious consequences" if they continue to oppose the legislation. McConnell later clarified that his statement excluded corporate donations to the Republican Party, which prompted accusations of hypocrisy by liberals. During a discussion on Fox Business's Varney & Co. about his push to remove the Major League Baseball anti-trust exemption after MLB's negative reaction to changes to Georgia voting laws, Ted Cruz claimed that corporations had become "the woke enforcers of the Democratic Party". Observers have suggested that this increased Republican criticism of corporations is part of the rebrand of the GOP into a more "working class" party, and that it indicates a shift in the relationship between Republicans and corporate America, though others have argued no such shift is occurring. Some Republicans also called out companies that operate in China, claiming their public stance against U.S. voting restrictions is hypocritical due to their perceived silence on human rights abuses in China.

Donald Trump urged his supporters to boycott "woke companies" that are in opposition to the new voting laws.

Joe Biden called Republican efforts to limit voting rights "un-American" and "sick" and compared them to Jim Crow voting restrictions.

=== Polls ===
A YouGov/Economist poll from March 20–22 found that 44% of Americans oppose more restrictive voting laws compared to 39% who support them. A Hill/HarrisX poll of 2,827 registered voters conducted in April 2021 found that 43% (including 70% of Republicans and 41% of Independents) supported stricter voting laws, while 31% (including 50% of Democrats) stated that new laws should be passed to make voting more accessible. Another 27% expressed opposition to changing existing voting laws.

In January 2022, a Yahoo News/YouGov poll found that 17 percent of Republicans and Republican-leaning independents labeled "stopping Democrats from rigging and stealing elections" as the third most important issue they wanted future candidates to focus on; it ranked behind "securing the border" at 23 percent and "bringing down inflation" at 19 percent. 56 percent also stated they wanted the Republican Party to launch another investigation of the 2020 presidential election should they retake the U.S. congress in the 2022 midterm elections.

== Effects ==
There is debate over the effects Republican proposals would have. Available evidence on the effects of forms of voting being targeted by Republicans are as summarized below:

- Mail-in voting: Studies have tended to show that offering no-excuse mail-in voting modestly increases voter turnout, particularly in midterm elections. Universal mail-in voting, in which every voter is automatically sent a mail ballot, appears to increase turnout by slightly more—about 2%. Studies of the 2020 presidential election found that mail-in voting did not produce a partisan benefit for either party.
- Voter ID: Studies on voter ID have tended to show that voter ID laws have no detectable effect on voter fraud (which is already exceedingly rare) and little to no effect on voter turnout—though certain studies have found a depressing effect, particularly among minorities. Estimating the effects of voter ID laws, however, is complicated, and strict voter ID laws are only a recent phenomenon, leading some researchers to conclude that further election data is needed to conclusively pin down the effects of voter ID. What is certain, however, is that among people in the United States without photo ID (in Michigan, for example, there are roughly 28,000 registered voters without photo ID, or 0.6% of registered voters), racial minorities make up a disproportionately large number of them—with one study estimating that nonwhite voters were between 2.5 and 6 times as likely as white voters to lack voter ID.
- Early voting: Analysis by FiveThirtyEight has concluded that, while early voting shifts when many voters cast their ballots, it has little effect on turnout. It does, however, appear to lead to shorter lines and fewer ballot errors.
- Automatic voter registration: Automatic voter registration increases the number of people registered to vote and appears to modestly increase turnout.
- Same-day voter registration: Same-day registration appears to modestly increase voter turnout, with a 2004 summary of the literature finding that the impact of same-day registration on voter turnout is "about five percentage points".
- Long lines: Lines with long wait times significantly depress turnout. An analysis of the 2012 United States presidential election in Florida by Ohio State University researcher Theodore Allen, for instance, estimated that more than 200,000 would-be voters did not cast a ballot in the 2012 election due to long lines. Additionally, another study found that voters forced to wait in long lines are less likely to vote in future elections. Racial minorities face longer wait-times on average than white voters.

== Federal bills proposed by Democrats ==
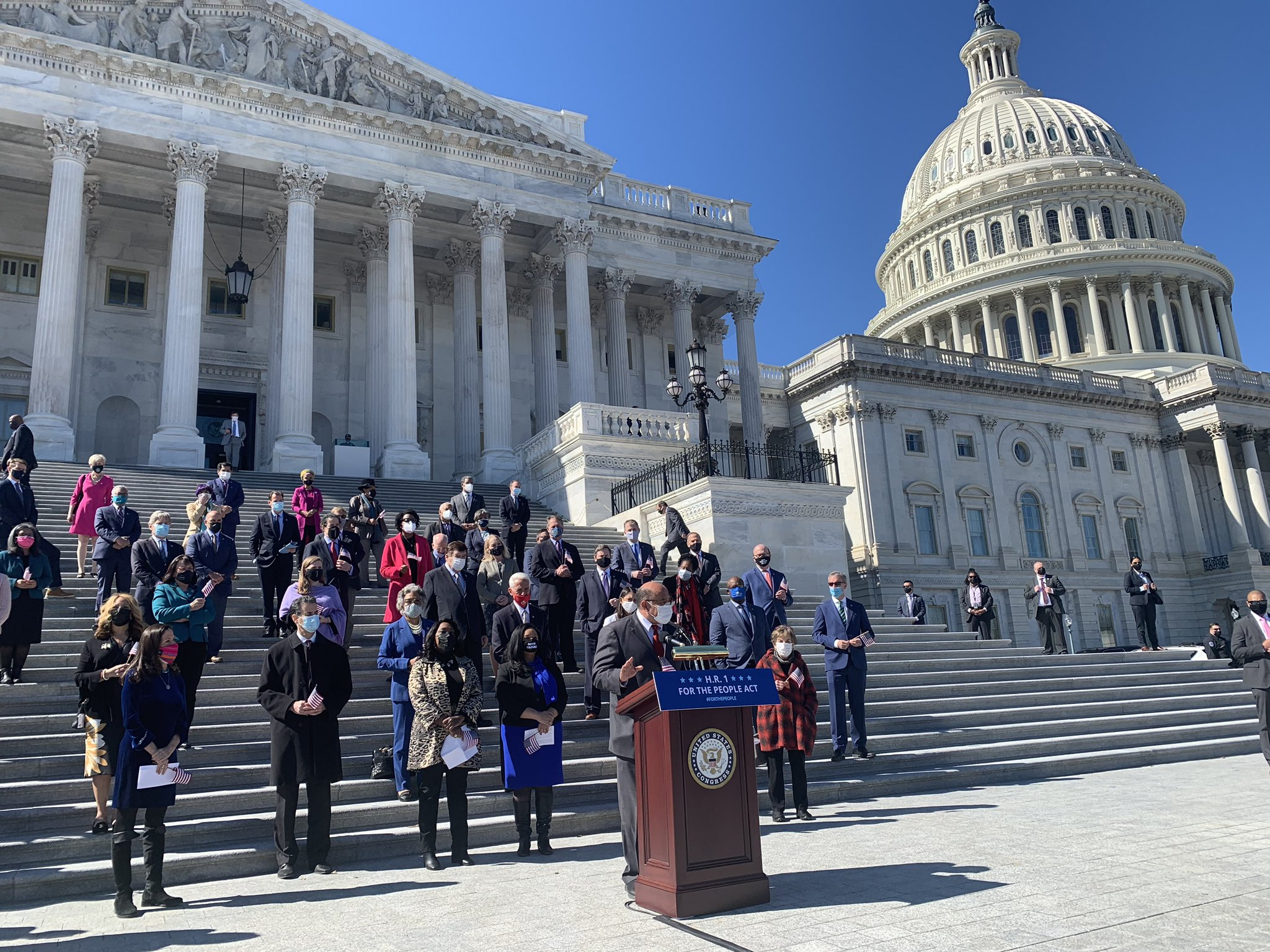
Democratic Congressmembers holding a press conference in support of the For the People Act in March 2021

The Republican effort has been contrasted with a simultaneous effort by Democratic Party lawmakers to expand voting access. At the federal level, Democrats advanced the For the People Act, a voting rights and anti-corruption bill (see below). In state legislatures, Democrats are advancing bills to expand mail-in and early voting, enact automatic and same-day voter registration, loosen photo ID laws, and increase the use of ballot drop boxes, and have already approved certain landmark bills like the Voting Rights Act of Virginia.

=== For the People Act (H.R. 1) ===
Many of the proposals being advanced by state Republicans would be prohibited under the For the People Act (H.R. 1), a voting rights bill currently in the Senate after it was passed in the House of Representatives on a nearly party-line vote (one Democrat voted against) in early March. The bill would mandate automatic and same-day voter registration, require states to offer 15 days of early voting, expand mail-in voting, and place restrictions on voter ID laws and so-called "voter roll purges", among other things.

On June 22, 2021, a vote on the bill was held in the senate. It received unified support from the Democratic caucus, but Senate Republicans blocked the bill with a filibuster, as it lacked the 60 votes needed to invoke cloture after a party-line vote. Some Senate Democrats expressed support for abolishing the filibuster for the bill, but others in their caucus remained opposed or expressed reservations about doing so, including President Biden.

=== John Lewis Voting Rights Act ===
The John Lewis voting rights act would restore the federal pre-clearance requirement in the Voting Rights Act of 1965 that was struck down by the Supreme Court in a 2013 decision. This would mean that states with a history of voting rights violations would have to seek approval from the federal government to change voting policies. If the VRA's pre-clearance requirement had been left in place, it may have blocked new restrictive election laws like the one passed in Georgia.

== See also ==
- Black suffrage in the United States
- Democratic backsliding in the United States
- Gerrymandering
- Republican Party efforts to disrupt the 2024 United States presidential election
- Voter suppression in the United States
- Trumpism
- Voter registration
