= For the People Act =

Election reform and anti-corruption bill in the 117th Congress

- Long title: An Act to expand Americans' access to the ballot box and reduce the influence of big money in politics, and for other purposes.
- Announced in: the 116th United States Congress
- Number of co-sponsors: 236

Legislative history
- Introduced in the House of Representatives as H.R. 1 by John Sarbanes (D–MD) on January 3, 2019; Committee consideration by House Judiciary

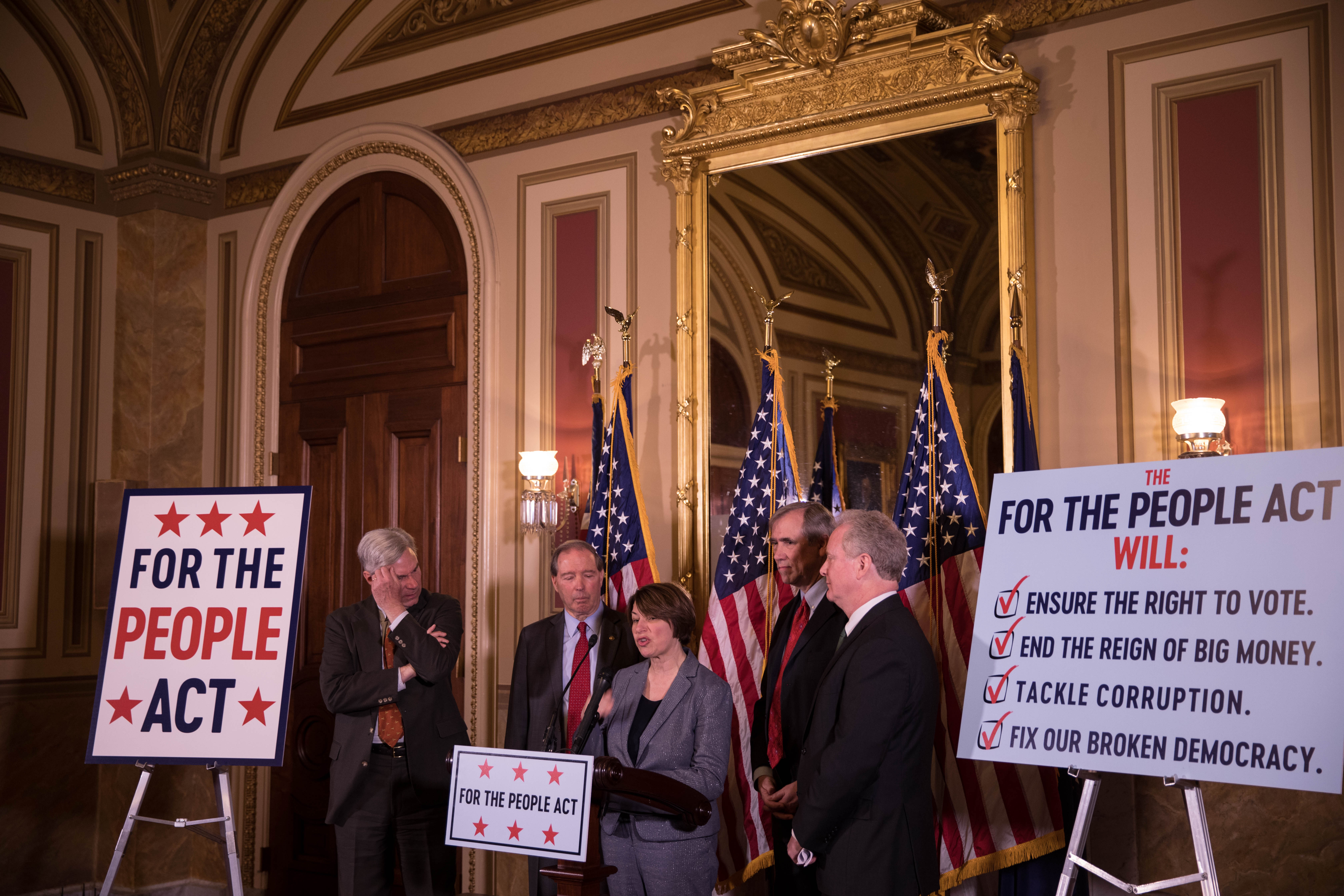
Senator Amy Klobuchar speaks on the Act from inside the Capitol Building

The For the People Act, introduced as H.R. 1, was a bill in the United States Congress intended to expand voting rights, change campaign finance laws to reduce the influence of money in politics, ban partisan gerrymandering, and create new ethics rules for federal officeholders.

The bill was originally introduced in 2019 by Representative John Sarbanes, on behalf of the newly elected Democratic majority in the United States House of Representatives as the first official legislation of the 116th United States Congress. The House passed it on March 8, by a party-line vote of 234–193. It was called a "signature piece of legislation". After the House passed it, the Republican-controlled Senate under Senate Majority Leader Mitch McConnell blocked it from receiving a vote.

In 2021, in the 117th Congress, congressional Democrats reintroduced the bill as H.R. 1 and S. 1. On March 3, 2021, it passed the House on a near party-line vote of 220–210, advancing to the Senate, which was split 50–50 between Democrats and Republicans, with Vice President Kamala Harris holding the tie-breaking vote, and Senate Majority Leader Chuck Schumer vowed to bring it to the floor for a vote. On June 22, 2021, the Senate voted on the bill. It received unanimous support from the Democratic caucus, but Senate Republicans blocked it with a filibuster, as it lacked the 60 votes needed to invoke cloture after a party-line vote. Some Senate Democrats expressed support for abolishing the filibuster for it, but others in the caucus opposed or expressed reservations about doing so, including Joe Manchin and Kyrsten Sinema.

== Key provisions ==
=== Voting rights ===
The bill would have required states to offer same-day voter registration for federal elections and permitted voters to make changes to their registration at the polls. It would have required states to hold early voting for at least two weeks and would have established automatic voter registration for individuals to be eligible to vote in elections for federal office. Under the automatic voter registration provision, eligible citizens who provide information to state agencies (including state departments of motor vehicles or public universities) would have been automatically registered to vote unless they opted out of doing so. The bill would also have expanded opportunities to vote by mail and made Election Day a federal holiday. It would have required states to offer online voter registration, which has already been adopted in 39 states and the District of Columbia; under the bill, states would have been required to establish a system to allow applications to be electronically completed, submitted, and received by election officials, and to allow registered voters to electronically update their voter registration information. It would have established criminal penalties for persons who "corruptly hinder, interfere with, or prevent another person from registering to vote" and for voter deception or intimidation (it would have specifically prohibited "knowing and intentional communication of false and misleading information – including about the time, place, or manner of elections, public endorsements, and the rules governing voter eligibility and voter registration – made with the intent of preventing eligible voters from casting ballots"). It would have instructed the Election Assistance Commission to adopt recommendations for states on the prevention of interference with voter registration.

The bill would also have authorized 16- and 17-year-olds to pre-register to vote in advance of their becoming 18. A 2019 proposal by Representative Ayanna Pressley to amend it to actually allow 16- and 17-year-olds to vote did not succeed. It would also have prohibited the practice of voter caging and restricted the practicing of voter-roll purges by limiting states' ability to remove registered voters from the rolls and setting conditions for when they could do so. Specifically, it would have required states to obtain certain information before removing voters from the rolls, and prohibited voter purges from taking place less than six months before an election. It would have prohibited any person from communicating "materially false" claims meant to prevent others from voting 60 days before an election and compelled the attorney general to correct such misinformation. It would also have required election officials to timely notify any voter tagged for removal from the rolls and give them an opportunity to contest the removal or seek reinstatement of their registration. It would also have restored voting rights to felons who had completed their prison terms.

The bill contained various provisions to promote voting access for people with disabilities and provisions to strengthen the Uniformed and Overseas Citizens Absentee Voting Act (UOCAVA) by providing additional protections for military and overseas voters. To ensure UOCAVA compliance, it would have required "all states ... to send uniformed service and overseas voters' ballots at least 45 days before a federal election (provided a request was received at least 45 days before the election); require states to use and pay for express delivery and return of ballots if they fail to send ballots to uniformed and overseas voters by that deadline; [and] extend the guarantee of state residency for voting purposes to all spouses and dependents of absent servicemembers (current law extends the guarantee of residency only to servicemembers themselves)." It would have created a cause of action allowing the attorney general or a private party to sue if a state violated these provisions, and would have required states to send reports to Congress documenting "the availability of absentee balloting for servicemembers and overseas voters, how many ballots were transmitted, and how many were returned."

The bill would also have created a Congressional task force on voting rights in American territories.

=== Election security ===
The bill contained election security provisions, including a voter verified paper ballot provision mandating the use of paper ballots that could be marked by voters either by hand or with a ballot marking device and inspected by the voter to allow any errors to be corrected before the ballot is cast. It would also have required state officials to preserve paper ballots for recounts or audits and conduct a hand count of ballots for recounts and audits. It would also have required the voting machines used in all federal elections to be manufactured in the U.S.

The bill would also have directed the National Science Foundation "to make grants to study, test, and develop accessible paper ballot voting, verification, and casting mechanisms."

=== Campaign finance reform ===
The bill would have introduced voluntary public financing for campaigns, matching small donations at a 6:1 ratio. The money would have come from a new "Freedom From Influence Fund" under the Department of the Treasury, which would have collected funds by charging a small fee on criminal and civil fines and penalties or settlements with banks and corporations that committed corporate malfeasance. It also incorporated campaign finance reform provisions from the DISCLOSE Act, which would have imposed stricter limitations on foreign lobbying, required super PACs and other "dark money" organizations to disclose their donors, and restructured the Federal Election Commission to reduce partisan gridlock. It would have expressed support for a constitutional amendment to overturn Citizens United v. FEC.

The bill would also have raised the limit that the national committee of a political party can spend on a political candidate to $100,000,000.

=== Ethics ===
The bill would have required the president and vice president, as well as presidential and vice-presidential candidates, to publicly disclose their previous ten years of income tax returns. It also would have eliminated the use of taxpayer money by members of Congress to settle employment discrimination claims by requiring members of Congress to reimburse the Treasury for any such payments. (Note: An obligation for members of Congress to reimburse the government for payments made to settle harassment claims was established by legislation enacted in 2018; the H.R. 1 proposal was to extend this requirement to all forms of employment discrimination.) It also would have required the Judicial Conference of the United States agency to establish rules of ethics binding on the Supreme Court of the United States, the only court in the U.S. without a binding canon of judicial ethics.

The bill would have set new disclosure rules and limitations on presidential inaugural committees. It would have barred inaugural committees from taking money from corporations; imposed a contribution limit to inaugural committees of $50,000 per person (current law provides no limit); required that contributions of more than $1,000 be disclosed within one day; and restricted the use of funds donated to inaugural committees to use for inaugural events and charitable contributions.

=== Findings in support of D.C. statehood ===
The bill would have made findings in support of admitting the District of Columbia as a state. Specifically, it would have affirmed Congress's power under the Article Four of the Constitution to create a new state in the populated area that is now D.C., while retaining a separate federal district comprising the Capitol Complex, White House, National Mall, and certain other federal areas. It would not have itself admitted D.C. as a state; separate legislation, the Washington, D.C., Admission Act, would actually have admitted D.C. to the Union. The House of Representatives passed that legislation in June 2020 on a nearly party-line vote, but the measure was not taken up in the Republican-controlled Senate. The House passage of the Washington, D.C., Admission Act marked the first time that either chamber of Congress had passed a D.C. statehood bill, and the Democratic leadership in the House vowed to bring a D.C. statehood bill to the floor again in the 117th Congress, which they did on April 22, 2021, and which passed again by a vote of 216–208.

=== Gerrymandering ===
The bill would have attempted to thwart gerrymandering by requiring states to use independent redistricting commissions to draw congressional district lines, except in states with only one congressional district. It would have prohibited partisan gerrymandering (creating a map that "unduly favor[s] or disfavor[s]" one political party over another). It would have required each commission to have 15 members (five Democrats, five Republicans, and five independents) and required proposed maps to achieve a majority vote to be accepted, with at least one vote in support from a Democrat, a Republican, and an independent. It would have required the commissions to draw congressional district lines by five criteria: "(1) population equality, (2) compliance with the Voting Rights Act, (3) compliance with additional racial requirements (no retrogression in, or dilution of, minorities' electoral influence, including in coalition with other voters), (4) respect for political subdivisions and communities of interest, and (5) no undue advantage for any party."

=== Number of federal election commissioners ===
Under contemporary law, the Federal Election Commission (FEC) had six members, no more than three of whom could be members of the same political party, with at least four votes required for any official FEC action. The complaint was that this had resulted in an impotent and gridlocked FEC with important reforms left unaddressed, such as the updating of campaign finance law for the digital age and effective regulation of political donations. Some advocates for reform blamed the Republican FEC members for unwillingness either to investigate any potential violations or to impose tougher restrictions, and for loosening restrictions simply by signaling what standards they were willing to enforce.

The bill would have given the FEC five commissioners instead of six, reducing the likelihood of tie votes, and required that no more than two could be members of the same political party. It would have set up a "Blue Ribbon Advisory Panel" consisting of an odd number of individuals selected by the president from retired federal judges, former law enforcement officials, or people with experience in election law, except anyone who held any public office at the time of selection, but the president would not have been required to choose from among those recommended by the panel. Some observers claimed that there would be no built-in benefit for either party under this system.

== Reactions and statements ==
=== Support ===
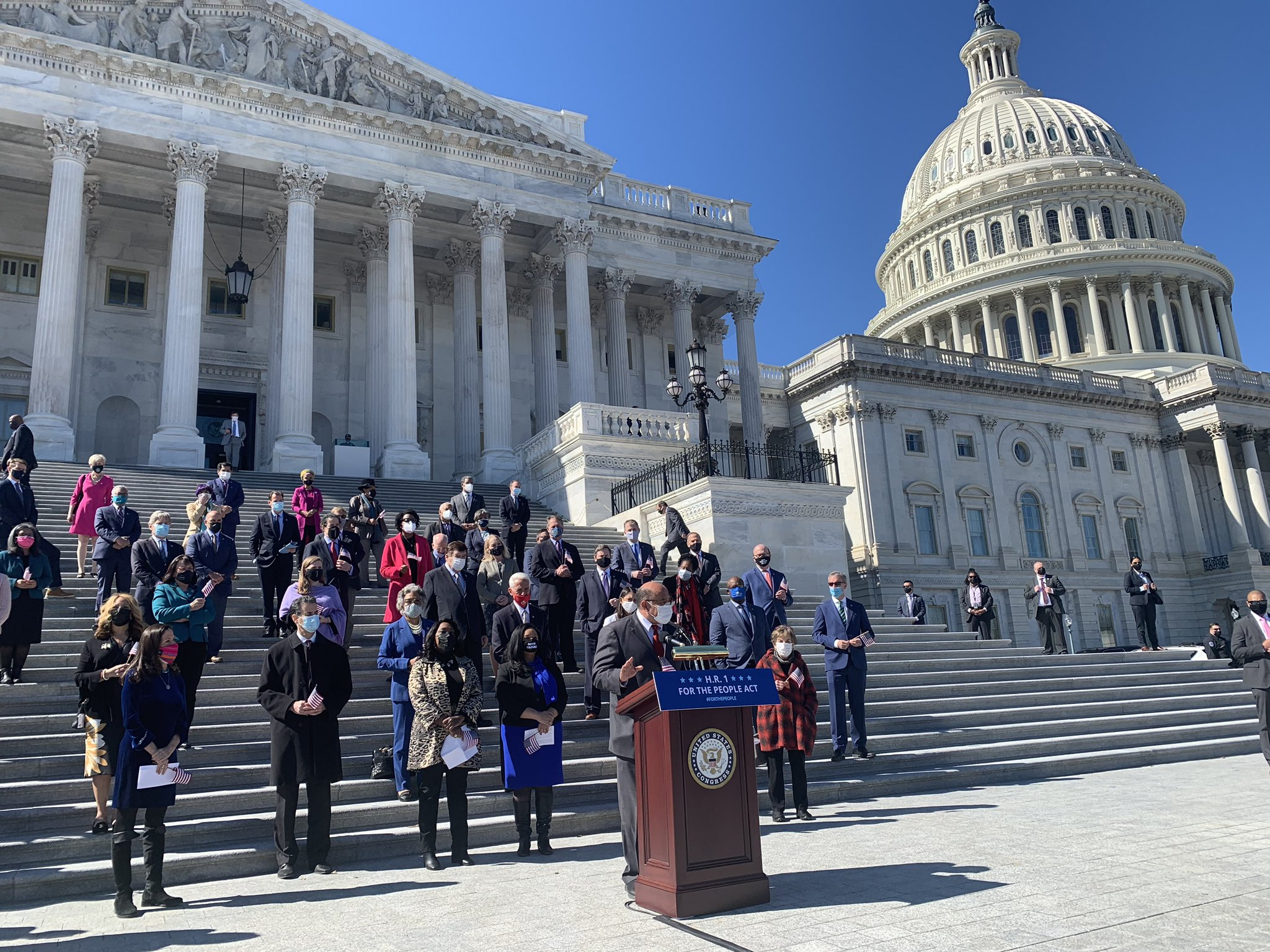
Democratic Congressmembers holding a press conference in support of the Act in March 2021.

The bill was supported by President Joe Biden, congressional Democrats, and liberal political commentators. Several civil rights organizations supported it, such as the Leadership Conference on Civil and Human Rights (which includes the AFL-CIO, Common Cause, NAACP, Sierra Club, Center for Constitutional Rights, and others), the League of Women Voters, the Brennan Center for Justice, End Citizens United, Stand Up America, and the League of Conservation Voters. The editorial boards of the New York Times and the Washington Post supported it, with the former saying that it would "make the American political system more accessible and accountable to the American people" and "put an end to at least some of the vile voter suppression practices that Republicans have embraced in recent years." The Economist similarly voiced support for it, writing that "making voting easy and secure ought to be the aim of any party committed to democracy" and arguing that, while it was "not perfect", it would "restrict the ability of state parties to game voting laws."

Common arguments in support of the bill were that it would have limited gerrymandering by mandating districts be drawn by independent redistricting commissions; that it would have made voting easier by expanding mail-in voting, requiring at least 15 consecutive days of early voting, and making Election Day a federal holiday; that it would have prevented forms of voter suppression like voter-roll purges; that it would have reduced the influence of dark money in politics; that it would have re-enfranchised felons who have served their sentences; and that it would have reduce the influence of "big money" in politics by setting up a donation-matching fund for small-dollar donations. Many political commentators viewed it as a defense against an onslaught of voting restrictions pushed by state Republicans following claims by former President Donald Trump that the 2020 election was rigged in favor of Biden; on this view, Republicans pushed a false narrative about the 2020 election to lower citizens' confidence in the integrity of elections, then used that lack of confidence as pretext to impose new voting restrictions.

At a March 2019 news conference before the House of Representatives passed the bill, Speaker of the House Nancy Pelosi said it would "restore the people's faith that government works for the public interest, the people's interests, not the special interests." In a June 2021 open letter, more than 100 university professors and scholars urged suspension of the filibuster to pass it, writing that "our entire democracy is now at risk" due to Republican efforts at "radical changes to core electoral procedures in response to unproven and intentionally destructive allegations of a stolen election."

=== Opposition ===
The bill was opposed by Republican officials, conservative think tanks, including The Heritage Foundation and conservative political commentators. The Wall Street Journal editorial board opposed it, contending that it was "designed to auto-enroll likely Democratic voters, enhance Democratic turnout, with no concern for ballot integrity." The editors of National Review, a conservative magazine, similarly opposed it, calling it a "radical assault on American democracy, federalism, and free speech". Common criticisms of the bill included allegations that it would have undermined election security by, among other things, mandating no-excuse mail-in voting and automatic voter registration, restricting voter ID laws and voter caging, and prohibiting laws against ballot collection; that it would have subverted states' rights to set election laws by mandating independent redistricting commissions, preventing states from disenfranchising felons, and setting minimum time periods states must offer early voting; that its financial disclosure regulations would have restricted free speech rights; and that small-dollar donation matching was wasteful spending. Some Republicans also expressed concern that it would make it more challenging for Republicans to be elected.

In 2019, then-Senate Majority leader Mitch McConnell issued a statement criticizing the bill as a "one-sided power grab" by the Democratic Party and said it would not pass the Republican-controlled Senate. He further criticized it for giving the federal government more power over elections, saying it would give "Washington, D.C. politicians even more control over who gets to come here [Congress] in the first place." On March 6, 2019, McConnell told reporters he would not allow it to come to a vote on the Senate floor. The White House issued a statement arguing that it would "micromanage" elections that are run largely by states and would establish a "costly and unnecessary program to finance political campaigns." U.S. Representative Dan Crenshaw claimed in 2019 that it would "legalize" the type of fraud seen in the 2018 North Carolina 9th congressional district election. In March 2021, the conservative organization American Action Network launched an ad campaign against it after it passed the House. On March 10, 2021, Senator Mike Lee said it was "as if written in Hell by the Devil himself." On April 6, 2021, South Carolina Governor Henry McMaster invoked states' rights as a reason to oppose it, calling it "a threat to the constitutional sovereignty of South Carolina".

During a May 2021 Senate Rules Committee hearing, Senator Ted Cruz asserted that House Democrats had "designed" the bill to direct people "to break the law and register millions of people to vote who are not eligible to vote because they are not United States citizens" and "automatically registers to vote anyone who interacts with the government", regardless of their immigration status, despite that it repeatedly stated that only U.S. citizens would be permitted to register.

In a June 2021 editorial for the Charleston Gazette-Mail, Democratic Senator Joe Manchin, a crucial vote for the bill to see passage in the 117th Congress, wrote, "I believe that partisan voting legislation will destroy the already weakening binds of our democracy, and for that reason, I will vote against the For the People Act."

=== Other ===
The American Civil Liberties Union (ACLU) opposed the 2019 version of the bill, praising the "many provisions of H.R. 1 that we strongly support and have long championed" but arguing that other provisions would "unconstitutionally infringe the freedoms of speech and association" of citizens and public interest groups. The ACLU specifically opposed the DISCLOSE Act provisions (which, among other things, would require organizations that engage in campaign-related disbursements to disclose the names and addresses of donors who give $10,000 or more) and the expanded Stand By Every Ad Act provisions (which would broaden existing disclosure requirements).

In 2021, the ACLU stopped short of opposing the bill. The group said, "following the Trump administration's relentless attacks on our democratic system of government, a serious legislative effort to restore and strengthen our republic is needed now more than ever, and we strongly support many of the voting rights provisions in H.R. 1", but called proposed requirements for some organizations to disclose certain donors "onerous and dangerous". Some former ACLU officials signed a joint letter from constitutional scholars that advocated for passage of the bill as the "most significant pro-democracy legislation since the Voting Rights Act of 1965" and continued, "we do not view First Amendment concerns over the precise scope of disclosure requirements affecting large donors to tax-exempt organizations operating on the margins of electoral politics as outweighing the need for expeditious enactment of the clearly desirable aspects of H.R. 1 into law."

=== Constitutionality ===
Several conservative commentators and lawyers, as well as 20 Republican state attorneys general, asserted that the bill was unconstitutional. Among their claims were that each state, not the federal government, had the power to oversee and regulate elections under the Constitution, and that provisions of the bill would violate the First Amendment as well as previous Supreme Court rulings such as McPherson v. Blacker (1892) and Bush v. Gore (2000). Some legal scholars, such as Trevor Potter and Franita Tolson, have rejected these claims, noting that the Elections Clause in Article One, Section 4 of the Constitution gives the Congress the power "at any time" to "make or alter" state election regulations.

In September 2020, the progressive group Take Back the Court published a report arguing that if the bill were enacted, the Supreme Court would likely strike down its key elements (independent redistricting provisions, automatic voter registration, public campaign financing, disclosure requirements) "on the basis of implausible constitutional analysis" of the Elections Clause and the First, Tenth, and Fourteenth Amendments. The report said, "though arguments ... that the Court's majority is likely to deploy are unpersuasive, the conservative majority has issued rulings that dismantle democracy and voting rights repeatedly, often relying on questionable rationales."

== Public opinion ==
According to a January 2021 poll conducted by progressive think tank Data for Progress, American voters broadly supported the bill, with nearly 67% supporting it even after participants were provided opposition messaging. According to the poll, 77% of Democratic voters, 68% of independent voters, and 56% of Republican voters supported the bill.

A recording of a private conference call obtained by The New Yorker between a policy adviser to Senate Minority Leader Mitch McConnell and the leaders of several prominent conservative groups revealed that the Koch Brothers-affiliated advocacy group Stand Together had invested "substantial resources" researching the bill's popularity and message-testing opposition talking points. The group had concluded not only that the bill was broadly popular with the American public, but that opposition messaging to it was largely ineffective and so turning public opinion against it would be "incredibly difficult." It found that the argument that the bill "stops billionaires from buying elections" was particularly resonant with the public and conservatives should avoid publicly debating it but instead attempt to stop the bill with legislative maneuvers such as the filibuster.

== Unsuccessful efforts to pass ==
=== Passage in House in 2019 and 2020 and blockage in Senate ===
In January 2019, the bill passed the Democratic-majority House of Representatives on a party-line vote, but was killed in the Republican-controlled Senate. In the next Congress, in January 2021, a nearly identical bill again passed the House. Senate Republicans uniformly opposed the bill; they could block it through a filibuster, a procedural hurdle requiring a supermajority of 60 votes to advance legislation. In order to take action on the voting-rights bill and other legislative priorities, Senate Democrats considered filibuster reform, changing Senate rules in order to make the filibuster more difficult to use.

=== Continued blockage in the Senate ===
Much attention was paid to Senator Joe Manchin's position on H.R. 1 and, relatedly, the filibuster. As the most conservative Senate Democrat, Manchin would have had to support filibuster reform for H.R. 1 to pass over unified Republican opposition. He vehemently opposed abolishing the filibuster, citing a desire for bipartisanship, but implied he was open to the idea of restoring the filibuster to its form in the "popular imagination", where, to sustain a filibuster, senators must actually keep speaking on the Senate floor to extend debate and keep the bill open. Manchin told Axios's Mike Allen, "there should be pain to a filibuster" for those carrying it out, but later clarified that he did not support changing the 60-vote threshold to pass legislation or specific carve-outs for certain legislation like voting rights bills, as some progressive groups advocate. Manchin also clarified his comments on making the filibuster more painful to use, writing in an op-ed that he would not vote to weaken it at all.

==== Unsuccessful narrower proposal: Freedom to Vote Act ====
On June 22, 2021, Republicans blocked debate on the bill: a motion to proceed failed on a 50–50 party-line vote, ten votes short of the 60-vote supermajority required to move forward. Although Manchin was part of the party-line vote on that motion, he had come out earlier that month against the For the People Act, and later that month proposed a list of changes that, if adopted, would allow him to support the legislation. The compromise proposal, the Freedom to Vote Act (S. 2747), was formally introduced by Manchin, Amy Klobuchar, and other Democratic senators on September 14, 2021. It kept many parts of the original bill (including automatic voter registration for eligible citizens, making Election Day a holiday, creating a minimum 15-day early voting period for federal elections, and a prohibition on partisan gerrymandering), but added several voter ID requirements and dropped several other provisions in the original bill, such as a requirement that states offer no-excuse mail-in voting and same-day voter registration. A Brennan Center for Justice report said the narrowed bill "contains the vast majority of the most critical provisions that were in the For the People Act, although it does also reflect some important concessions that were needed to achieve unity among Senate Democrats."

Manchin's proposed compromise was backed by all Senate Democrats and notable allies, including prominent figures such as voting rights advocate Stacey Abrams, Senator Bernie Sanders, and former President Barack Obama, but on October 20, Senate Republicans filibustered it, and the cloture vote was party line 49-51.

Democrats attempted to pass the Freedom to Vote Act again on January 19, 2022, as part of a combined bill (H.R. 5746) with the John Lewis Voting Rights Act, but again failed to invoke cloture after a 50–50 party-line vote. They then attempted to change Senate rules to exempt both bills from the filibuster, but Senators Manchin and Kyrsten Sinema joined Senate Republicans in voting against the change.

== Legislative history ==
As of October 18, 2024:

Congress	Short title	Bill number(s)	Date introduced	Sponsor(s)	# of cosponsors	Latest status
116th Congress	For The People Act of 2019	H.R. 1	January 3, 2019	John Sarbanes (D-MD)	236	Passed in the House (234–193)
116th Congress	For The People Act of 2019	S. 949	March 28, 2019	Tom Udall (D-NM)	46	Died in Committee
117th Congress	For The People Act of 2021	H.R. 1	January 4, 2021	John Sarbanes (D-MD)	222	Passed in the House (220–210)
117th Congress	For The People Act of 2021	S.1	March 17, 2021	Jeff Merkley (D-OR)	48	Failed to report favorably from Rules Committee.
117th Congress	For The People Act of 2021	S.2093	June 16, 2021	Jeff Merkley (D-OR)	2	Cloture was not invoked (50–50)
117th Congress	Freedom to Vote Act	S.2747	September 9, 2021	Amy Klobuchar (D-MN)	49	Cloture was not invoked (49–51)
118th Congress	Freedom to Vote Act	H.R. 11	July 18, 2023	John Sarbanes (D-MD)	217	Referred to committees of jurisdiction.
118th Congress	Freedom to Vote Act	S. 1	July 25, 2023	Amy Klobuchar (D-MN)	51	Referred to committees of jurisdiction.

== See also ==
- Government by the People Act, a 2014 bill with some of the same goals and co-sponsors
- John Lewis Voting Rights Act
- Safeguard American Voter Eligibility Act
- Republican efforts to restrict voting following the 2020 United States presidential election
