= Government by the People Act =

Proposed U.S. campaign finance reform legislation

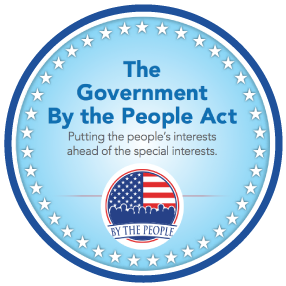

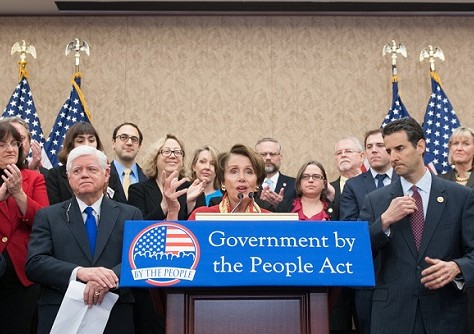
Nancy Pelosi, John Sarbanes, and other Democrats holding a press conference in support of the bill

The Government by the People Act or H.R. 20 was proposed United States campaign finance reform legislation introduced in 2014 in the 113th United States Congress.

Under the provisions of the act, political contributions of up to $150 would be matched by a factor of six times more than the original donation as long as candidates meet certain requirements. They must not use their own money, not accept donations over $1000, have already received at least $50,000 from 1000 in-state donors, and decline most political action committee money. In order to subsidize donations to political candidates, supporters said that it will close "corporate tax loopholes", though no financing mechanism had been identified. It was supported in print by Representatives Nancy Pelosi (D-CA), John Sarbanes (D-MD), Annie Kuster (D-NH), and Tulsi Gabbard (D-HI).

== See also ==
- For the People Act of 2019, which incorporates many of this bill's provisions
