= Lawrence Norden =

American lawyer

Lawrence D. Norden (born in Manhattan) is Vice President for the Elections and Government Program at the Brennan Center for Justice at New York University School of Law.

== Education and career ==
The son of a high school math teacher and an accountant, Norden majored in American history at the University of Chicago, after which he attended New York University School of Law. Prior to working at the Brennan Center, he worked as a corporate litigator at Stroock & Stroock & Lavan and as a bankruptcy lawyer at Hahn & Hessen.

== Research and views ==
=== Voting machines and registration ===
As a senior director for the Brennan Center for Justice, Norden is known for his research on voting machines and other election infrastructure in the United States. For example, a 2011 study by Norden found that as many as 60,000 votes cast in New York elections in 2010 were invalid because when casting them, the voters accidentally voted for multiple candidates, a problem the study attributed to both software errors and ambiguous instructions. In 2013, he told NPR that one in eight voter registration records is inaccurate, and that because registration "doesn't follow people when they move, even though a lot of people think it does," poll workers cannot find the names of some voters on election day.

=== Campaign finance reform ===
Norden has argued that six decisions by the Roberts Supreme Court have transformed the way American political campaigns are funded, largely for the worse. He expressed concern about the increased amount of dark money spent on the 2014 midterm elections, which he attributes, in part, to the Supreme Court's Citizens United decision. He has advocated for requiring government contractors to disclose political spending and tax credits for small campaign donations to increase the political participation and voice of average citizens.
